= Cathode ray tube =

Vacuum tube used to display images

Cathode ray tube cross section diagram (not to scale) with its focused and deflected electron beam (in green)

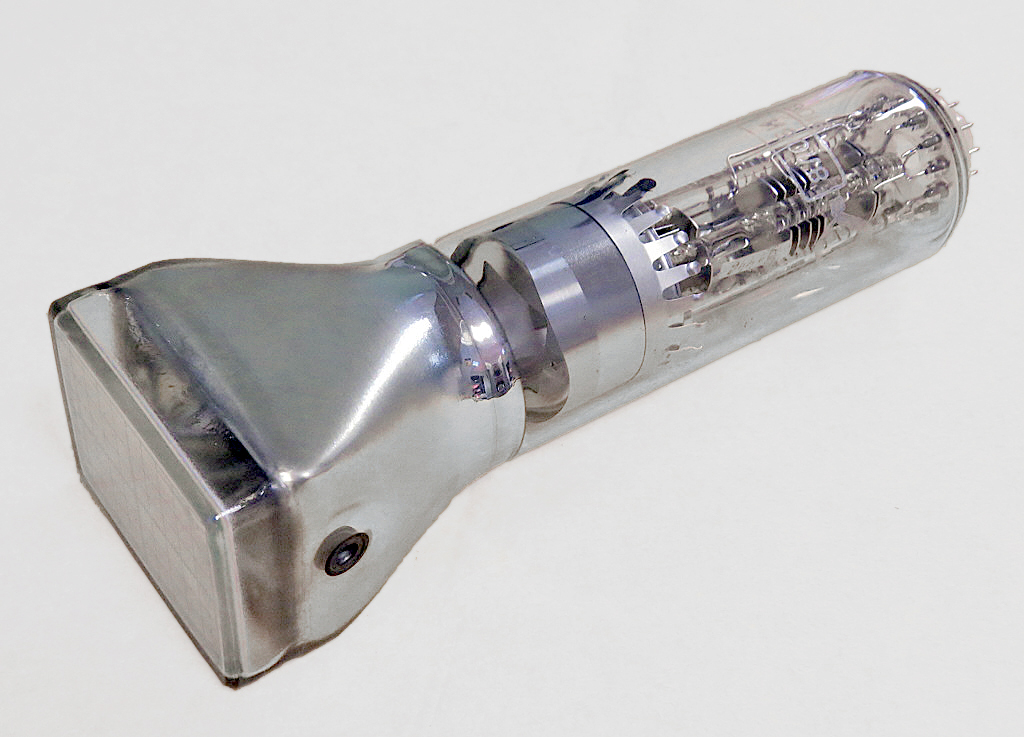
Oscilloscope cathode ray tube

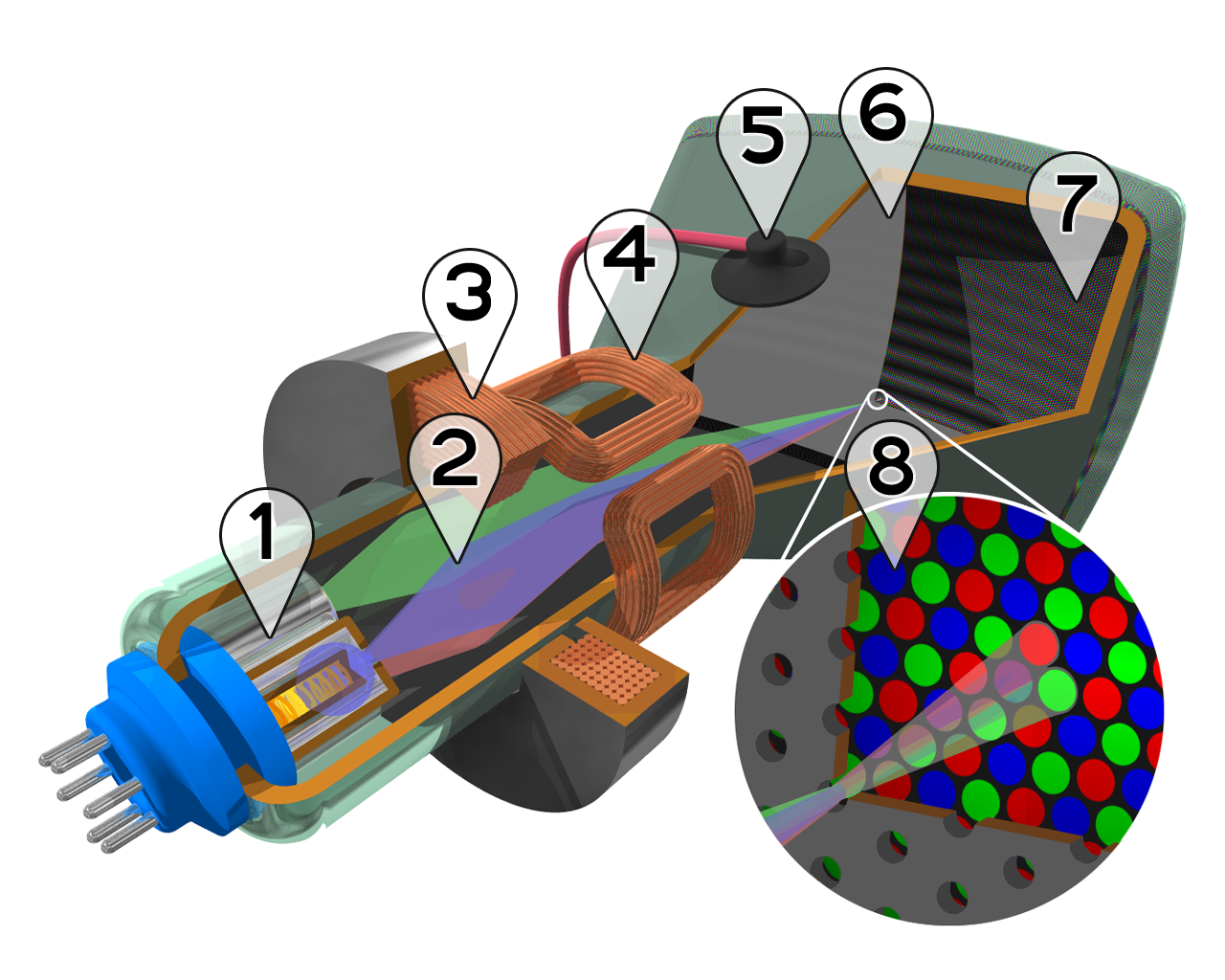
Cutaway rendering of a color CRT: 1. Electron guns (cathodes) for red, green, and blue; 2. Electron beams; 3. Focusing coils; 4. Deflection coils; 5. Anode connection; 6. Shadow mask for separating beams for red, green, and blue parts of the displayed image; 7. Phosphor layer; 8. Close-up of the phosphor layer showing red, green, and blue zones

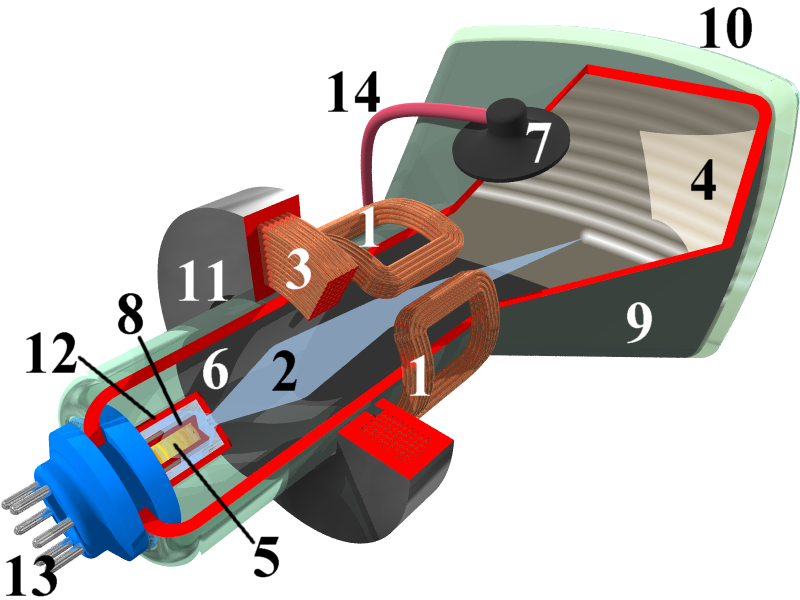
Cutaway rendering of a monochrome CRT: 1. Deflection coils; 2. Electron beam; 3. Focusing coil; 4. Phosphor layer; 5. Filament for heating the cathode; 6. Graphite layer on the inner side of the tube; 7. Anode connection; 8. Electron gun (cathode); 9. Air-tight glass body of the tube; 10. Screen; 11. Deflection yoke; 12. Control electrode modulating the intensity of the electron beam; 13. Contact pins for cathode, filament and control electrode; 14. Wire for anode high voltage; The only visible differences are the single electron gun, the uniform white phosphor coating, and the lack of a shadow mask.

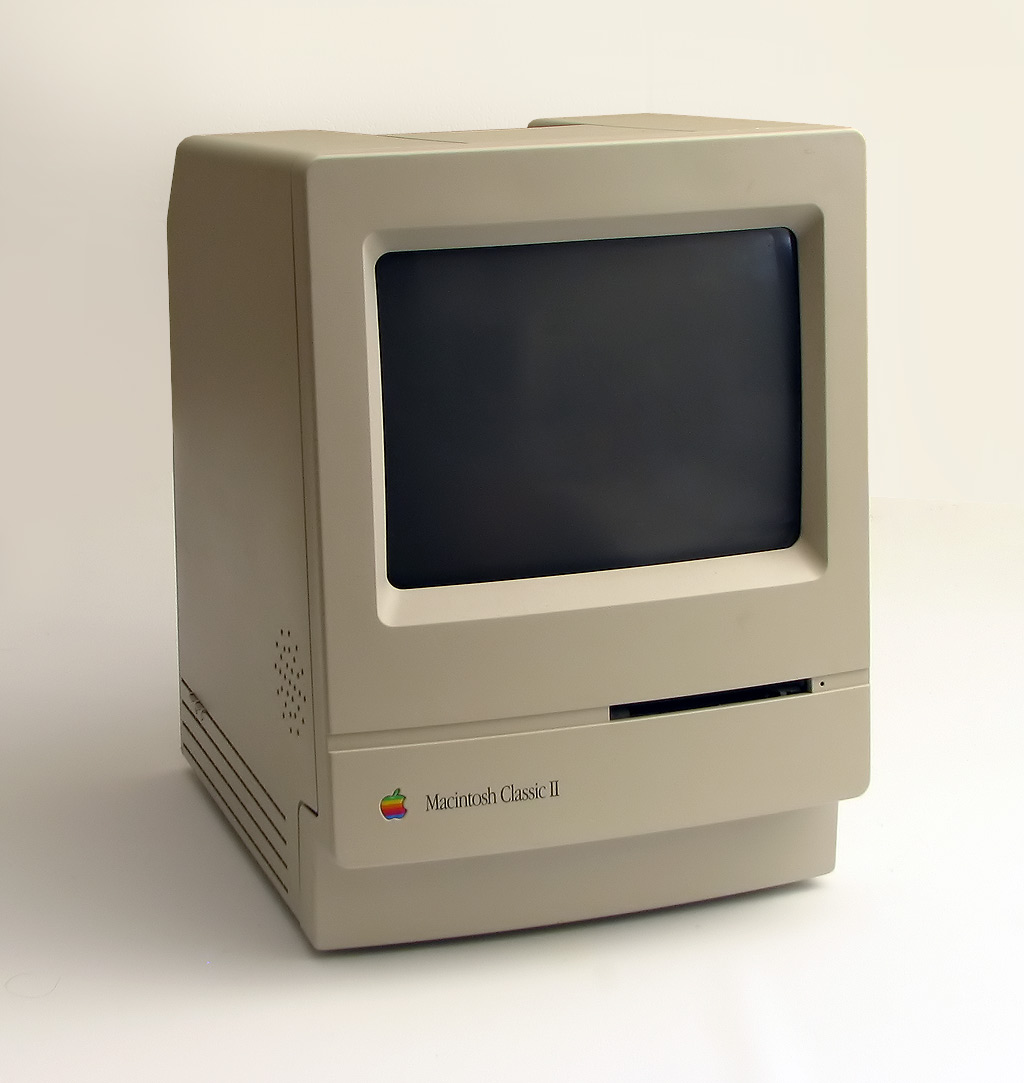
A Macintosh computer from the 1990s with integrated CRT display

A cathode ray tube (CRT) is a vacuum tube containing one or more electron guns, which emit electron beams, which are directed and controlled to display images on a phosphorescent screen. The images may represent electrical waveforms on an oscilloscope, a frame of video on an analog television set (TV), digital raster graphics on a computer monitor, or other phenomena like radar targets. A CRT in a TV is commonly called a picture tube. CRTs have also been used as memory devices, in which case the screen is not intended to be visible to an observer. The term cathode ray was used to describe electron beams when they were first discovered, before it was understood that what was emitted from the cathode was a beam of electrons.

A CRT works by electrically heating a tungsten coil which in turn heats a cathode in the rear of the CRT, causing it to emit electrons which are modulated and focused by electrodes. The electrons are steered by deflection coils or plates, and an anode accelerates them towards the phosphor-coated screen, which generates light when hit by the electrons. The entire front area of the tube is scanned repeatedly and systematically in a fixed pattern called a raster. In color devices, an image is produced by controlling the intensity of each of three electron beams, one for each additive primary color (red, green, and blue). In modern CRT monitors and TVs, the beams are bent by magnetic deflection, using a deflection yoke. Electrostatic deflection is commonly used in oscilloscopes.

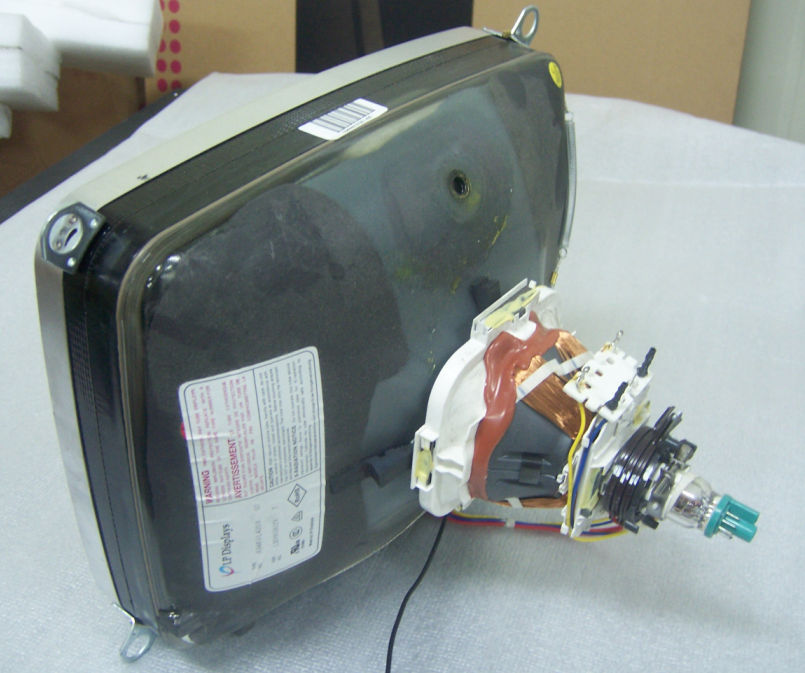
The rear of an LG.Philips Displays 14-inch color cathode ray tube showing its deflection coils and electron guns

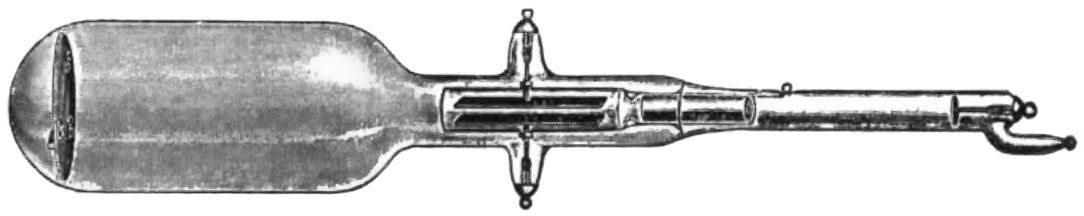
Braun's original cold-cathode CRT, 1897

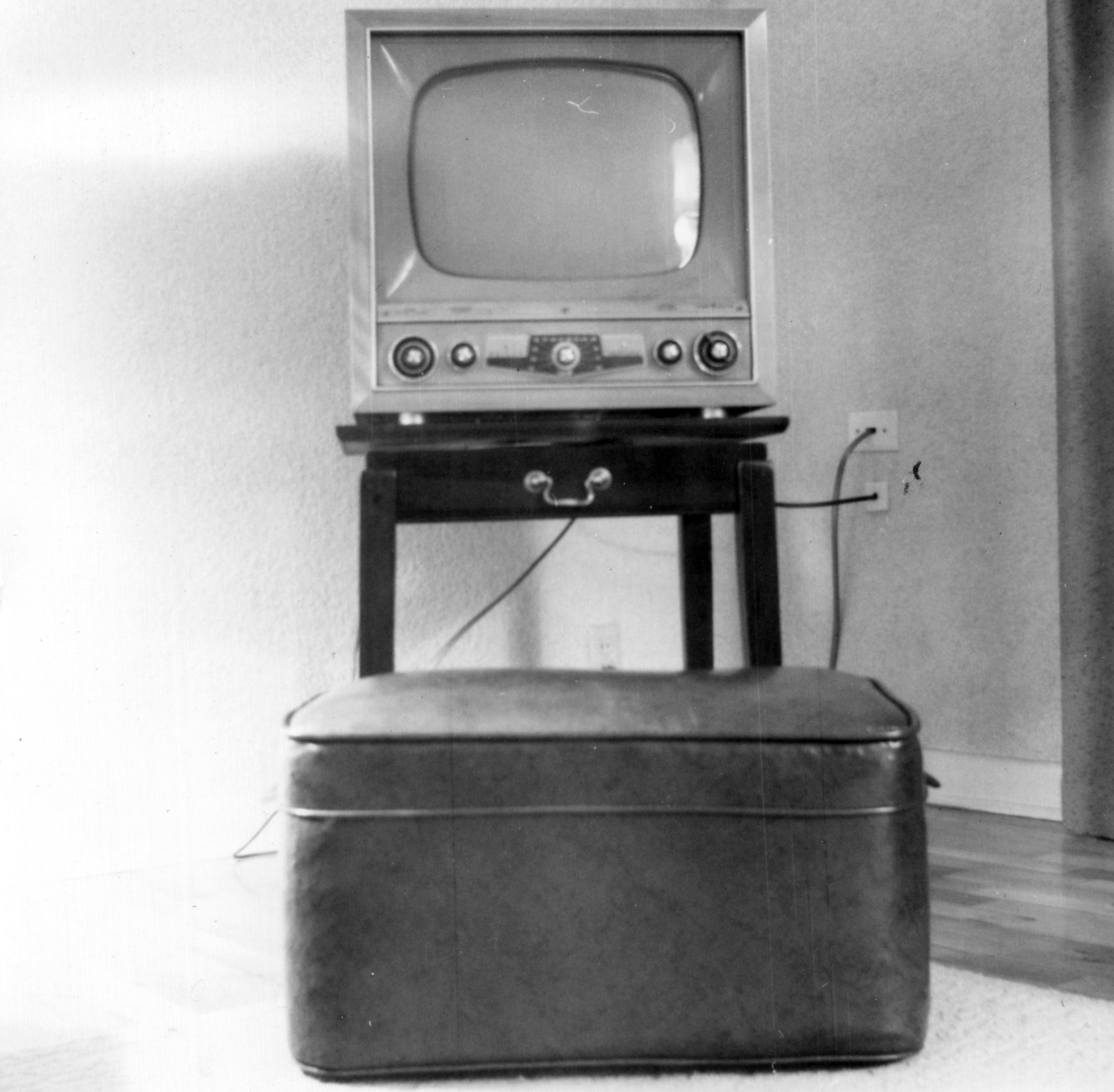
Typical 1950s United States monochrome CRT TV

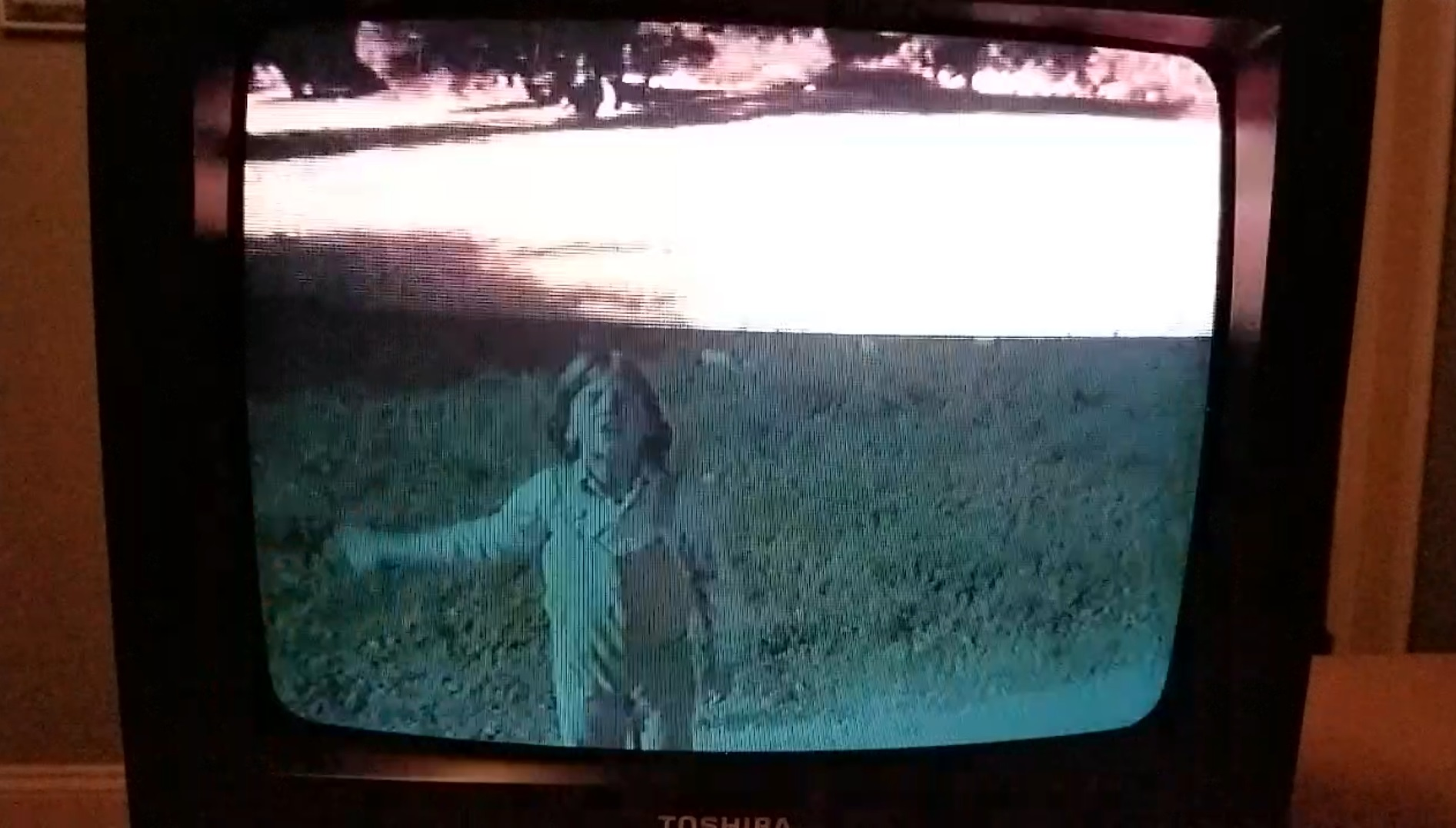
Snapshot of a CRT TV showing the image being drawn from top to bottom in a raster pattern

Animation of image construction using the interlacing method

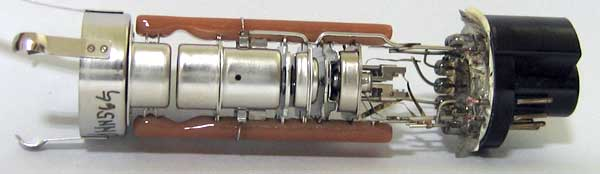
Color computer monitor electron gun

The tube is a glass envelope that is heavy, fragile, and long from the front screen face to its rear end. Its interior must be a partial vacuum to prevent the emitted electrons from colliding with air molecules and scattering before they hit the tube's face. Thus, the interior is evacuated to less than a millionth of atmospheric pressure. As such, handling a CRT carries the risk of violent implosion that can hurl glass at great velocity. The face is typically made of thick lead glass or special barium-strontium glass to be shatter-resistant and to block most X-ray emissions. The CRT makes up most of the weight of CRT TVs and computer monitors.

Since the late 2000s, CRTs have been superseded by flat-panel display technologies such as liquid-crystal display (LCD), plasma display, and OLED, which are cheaper to manufacture and operate and are also significantly lighter and thinner. Flat-panel displays can also be made in very large sizes, whereas 40–45 inches (100–110 cm) was about the largest size of a CRT.

== History ==
=== Discoveries ===
Cathode rays were discovered by Julius Plücker and Johann Wilhelm Hittorf. Hittorf observed that some unknown rays were emitted from the cathode (negative electrode) which could cast shadows on the glowing wall of the tube, indicating the rays were traveling in straight lines. In 1890, Arthur Schuster demonstrated cathode rays could be deflected by electric fields, and William Crookes showed they could be deflected by magnetic fields. In 1897, J. J. Thomson succeeded in measuring the mass-to-charge ratio of cathode rays, showing that they consisted of negatively charged particles smaller than atoms, the first subatomic particles, which had already been named electrons by Irish physicist George Johnstone Stoney in 1891.

The earliest version of the CRT was known as the Braun tube, invented by the German physicist Ferdinand Braun in 1897. It was a cold-cathode diode, a modification of the Crookes tube with a phosphor-coated screen. Braun was the first to conceive the use of a CRT as a display device.

In 1908, Alan Archibald Campbell-Swinton, fellow of the Royal Society (UK), published a letter in the scientific journal Nature, in which he described how "distant electric vision" could be achieved by using a cathode ray tube as both a transmitting and receiving device. He expanded on his vision in a speech given in London in 1911 and reported in The Times and the Journal of the Röntgen Society.

The first cathode ray tube to use a hot cathode was developed by John Bertrand Johnson (who gave his name to the term Johnson noise) and Harry Weiner Weinhart of Western Electric, and became a commercial product in 1922. The introduction of hot cathodes allowed for lower acceleration anode voltages and higher electron beam currents, since the anode now only accelerated the electrons emitted by the hot cathode, and no longer had to have a very high voltage to induce electron emission from the cold cathode.

=== Development ===
The technology of a cathode ray tube derives from a paper of Karl Ferdinand Braun in 1897 which describes his development of cathode-ray oscilloscope. Braun's paper came out just a few months before JJ Thomson's work that lead to the discovery that cathode-rays are streams of corpuscles now called electrons.

In 1926, Kenjiro Takayanagi demonstrated a CRT TV receiver with a mechanical video camera that received images with a 40-line resolution. By 1927, he improved the resolution to 100 lines, which was unrivaled until 1931. By 1928, he was the first to transmit human faces in half-tones on a CRT display.

In 1927, Philo Farnsworth created a TV prototype.

The CRT was named in 1929 by inventor Vladimir K. Zworykin. He was subsequently hired by RCA, which was granted a trademark for the term "Kinescope", RCA's term for a CRT, in 1932; it voluntarily released the term to the public domain in 1950.

In the 1930s, Allen B. DuMont made the first CRTs to last 1,000 hours of use, which was one of the factors that led to the widespread adoption of TV.

The first commercially made electronic TV sets with cathode ray tubes were manufactured by Telefunken in Germany in 1934.

In 1947, the cathode-ray tube amusement device, the earliest known interactive electronic game as well as the first to incorporate a cathode-ray-tube screen, was created.

From 1949 to the early 1960s, there was a shift from circular CRTs to rectangular CRTs, although the first rectangular CRTs were made in 1938 by Telefunken. While circular CRTs were the norm, European TV sets often blocked portions of the screen to make it appear somewhat rectangular while American sets often left the entire front of the CRT exposed or only blocked the upper and lower portions of the CRT.

In 1954, RCA produced some of the first color CRTs, the 15GP22 CRTs used in the CT-100, the first color TV set to be mass produced. The first rectangular color CRTs were also made in 1954. However, the first rectangular color CRTs to be offered to the public were made in 1963. One of the challenges that had to be solved to produce the rectangular color CRT was convergence at the corners of the CRT. In 1965, brighter rare earth phosphors began replacing dimmer and cadmium-containing red and green phosphors. Eventually blue phosphors were replaced as well.

The size of CRTs increased over time, from 20 inches in 1938, (Note: Experimental 31 inch CRTs were made as far back as 1938.) to 21 inches in 1955, 25 inches by 1974, 30 inches by 1980, 35 inches by 1985, and 43 inches by 1989. The world's largest was the Sony KX-45ED1 at 45 inches but only one known working model exists.

In 1960, the Aiken tube was invented. It was a CRT in a flat-panel display format with a single electron gun. Deflection was electrostatic and magnetic, but due to patent problems, it was never put into production. It was also envisioned as a head-up display in aircraft. By the time patent issues were solved, RCA had already invested heavily in conventional CRTs.

1968 marked the release of Sony Trinitron brand with the model KV-1310, which was based on Aperture Grille technology. It was acclaimed to have improved the output brightness. The Trinitron screen was identical with its upright cylindrical shape due to its unique triple cathode single gun construction.

In 1987, flat-screen CRTs were developed by Zenith for computer monitors, reducing reflections and helping increase image contrast and brightness. Such CRTs were expensive, which limited their use to computer monitors. Attempts were made to produce flat-screen CRTs using inexpensive and widely available float glass.

In 1990, the first CRT with HD resolution, the Sony KW-3600HD, was released to the market. The Sony KWP-5500HD, an HD CRT projection TV, was released in 1992.

In the mid-1990s, some 160 million CRTs were made per year.

In the mid-2000s, Canon and Sony presented the surface-conduction electron-emitter display and field-emission displays, respectively. They both were flat-panel displays that had one (SED) or several (FED) electron emitters per subpixel in place of electron guns. The electron emitters were placed on a sheet of glass and the electrons were accelerated to a nearby sheet of glass with phosphors using an anode voltage. The electrons were not focused, making each subpixel essentially a flood beam CRT. They were never put into mass production as LCD technology was significantly cheaper, eliminating the market for such displays.

The last large-scale manufacturer of (in this case, recycled) CRTs, Videocon, ceased in 2015. CRT TVs stopped being made around the same time.

In 2012, Samsung SDI and several other major companies were fined by the European Commission for price fixing of TV cathode ray tubes. The same occurred in 2015 in the US and in Canada in 2018.

Worldwide sales of CRT computer monitors peaked in 2000, at 90 million units, while those of CRT TVs peaked in 2005 at 130 million units.

=== Decline ===
Beginning in the late 1990s to the early 2000s, CRTs began to be replaced with LCDs, starting first with computer monitors smaller than 15 inches in size, largely because of their lower bulk. Among the first manufacturers to stop CRT production was Hitachi in 2001, followed by Sony in Japan in 2004. Flat-panel displays dropped in price and started significantly displacing cathode ray tubes in the 2000s. LCD monitor sales began exceeding those of CRTs in 2003–2004 and LCD TV sales started exceeding those of CRTs in some markets in 2005. Samsung SDI stopped CRT production in 2012.

Despite being a mainstay of display technology for decades, CRT-based computer monitors and TVs are now obsolete. Demand for CRT screens dropped in the late 2000s. Despite efforts from Samsung and LG to make CRTs competitive with their LCD and plasma counterparts, offering slimmer and cheaper models to compete with similarly sized and more expensive LCDs, CRTs eventually became obsolete and were relegated to developing markets and vintage enthusiasts once LCDs fell in price, with their lower bulk, weight and ability to be wall mounted coming as advantages.

Some industries still use CRTs because it is too much effort, downtime, or cost to replace them, or there is no substitute available; a notable example is the airline industry. Planes such as the Boeing 747-400 and the Airbus A320 used CRT instruments in their glass cockpits instead of mechanical instruments. They are also used in some military equipment for similar reasons. As of 2022, only one company remanufactures CRTs for these markets, utilising donor parts.

A popular consumer usage of CRTs is for retro gaming. Some games are impossible to play without CRT display hardware. Light guns only work on CRTs because they depend on the progressive timing properties of CRTs. Another reason people use CRTs is due to the natural blending of the image on the displays. Some games designed for CRT displays exploit this, and use the blending of detail and color to turn raw pixels into softer images for aesthetic appeal and variety. In addition, CRTs have less input latency than some LCDs between when one touches the controller and the action is reflected on screen; allowing for more precise control for consumers.

== Constructions ==
=== Body ===
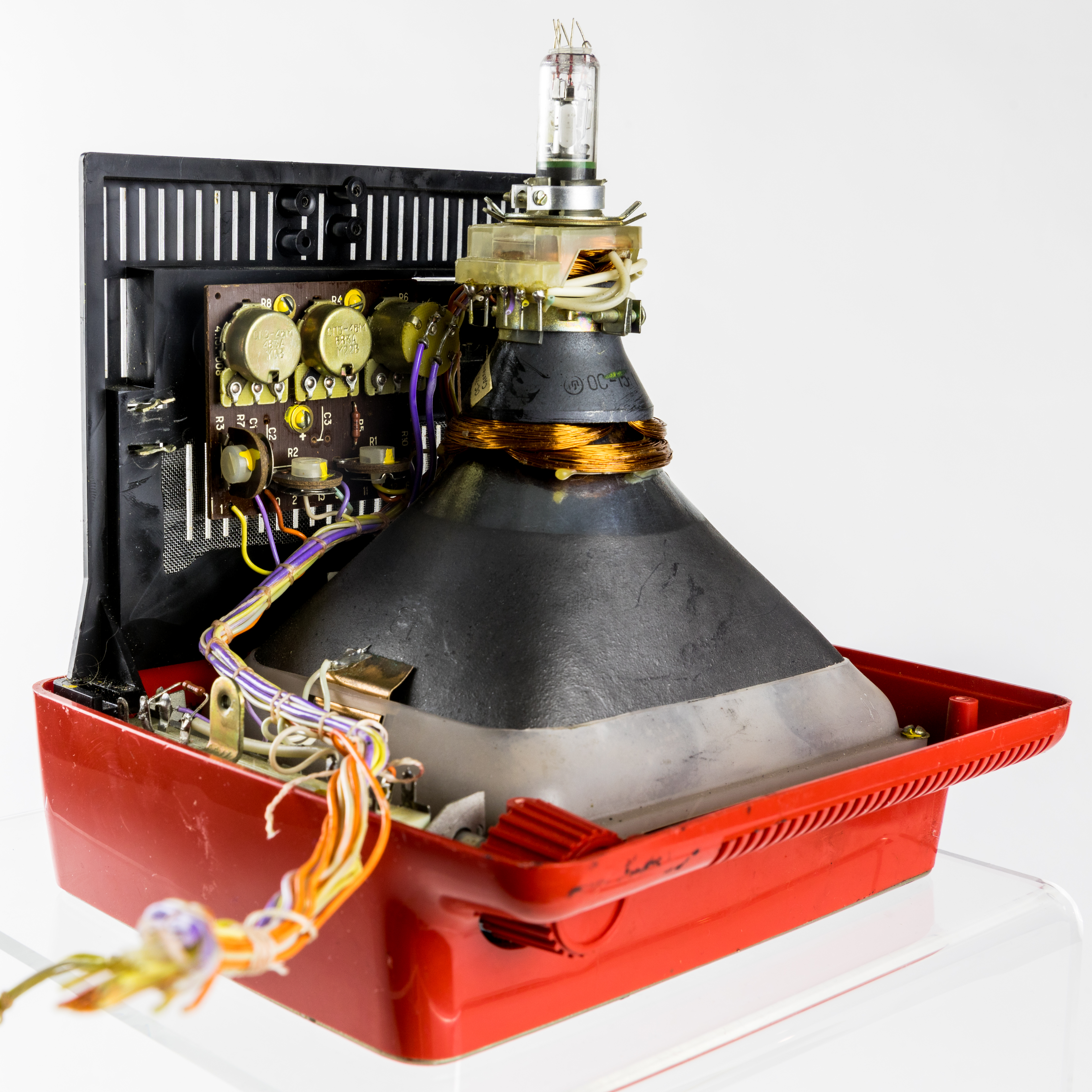
A monochrome CRT as seen inside a TV. The CRT is the single largest component in a CRT TV.

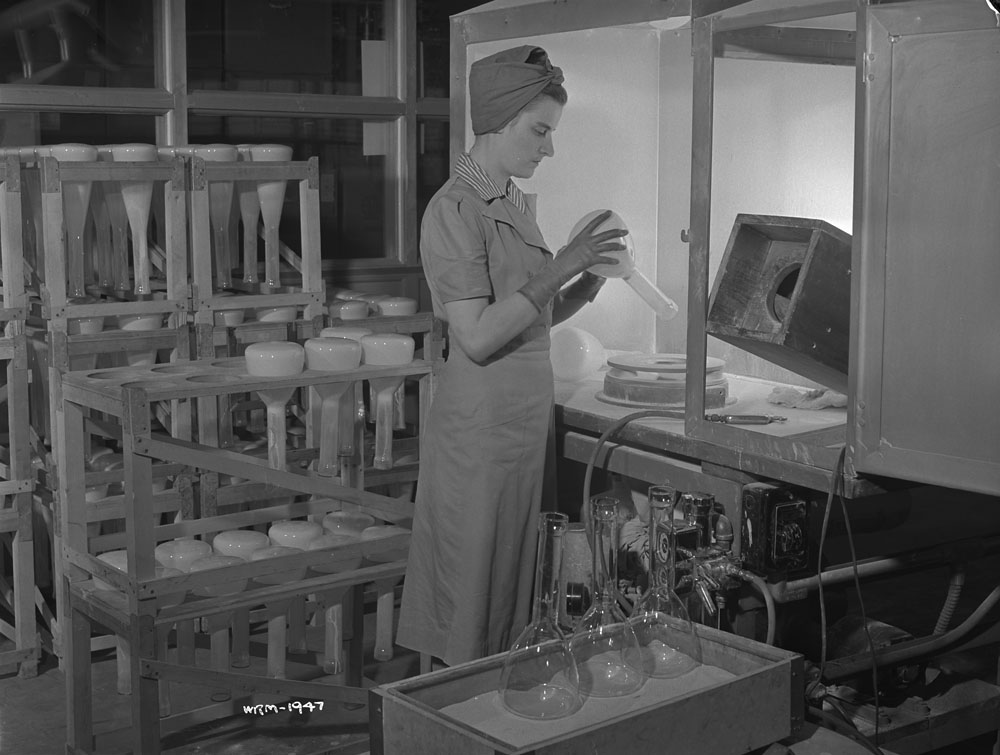
Small circular CRTs during manufacturing in 1947 (screens being coated with phosphor)

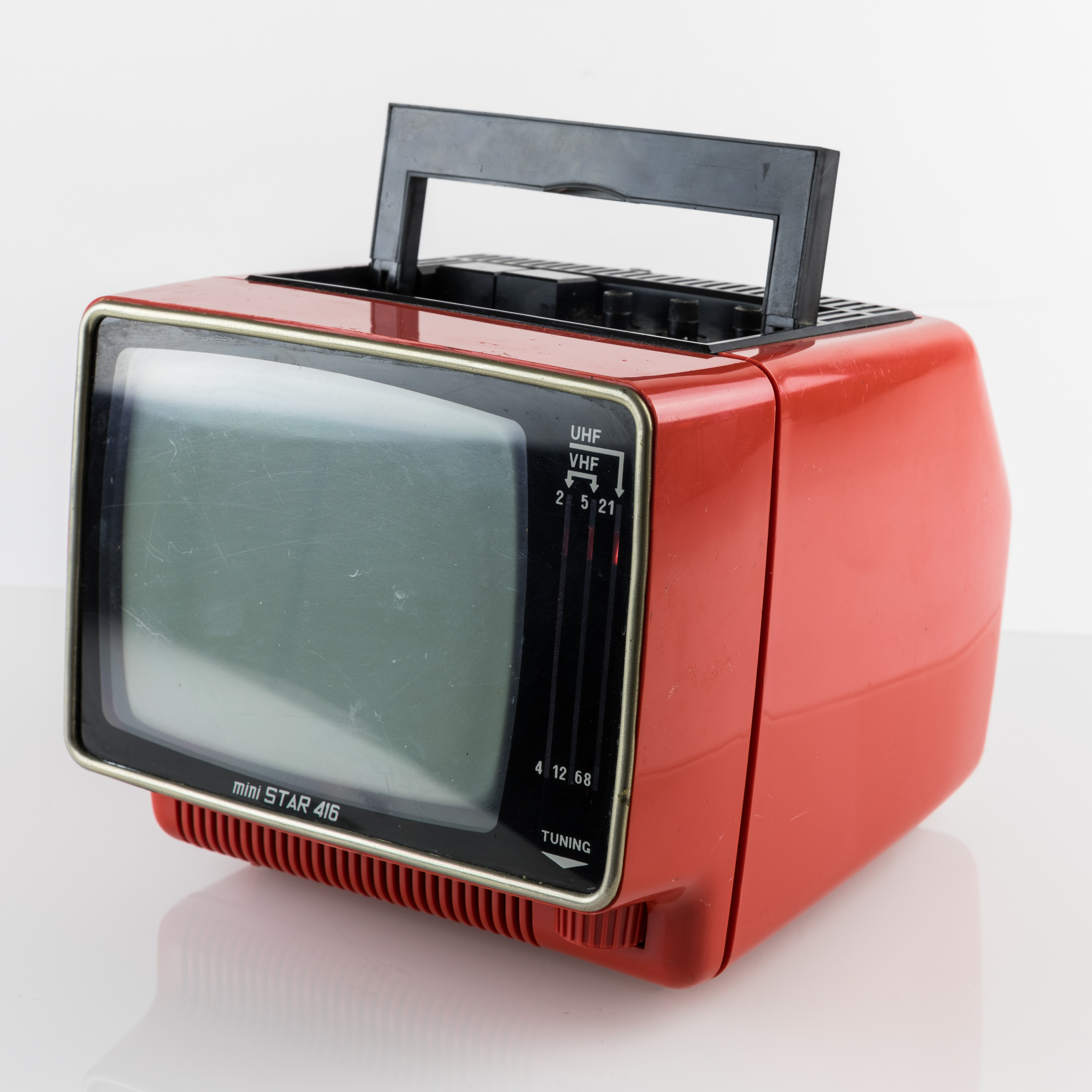
A portable monochrome CRT TV

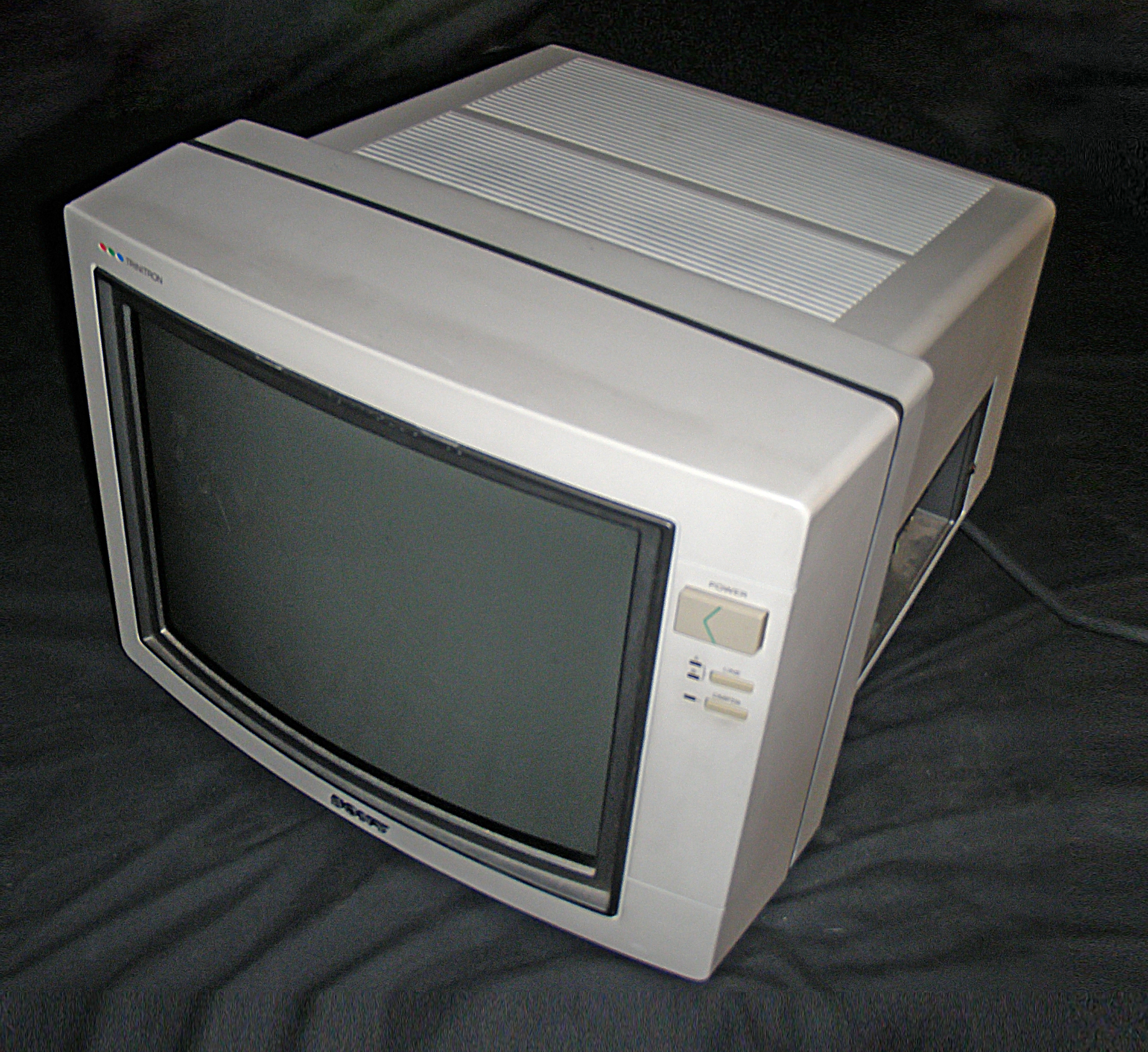
A Trinitron CRT computer monitor

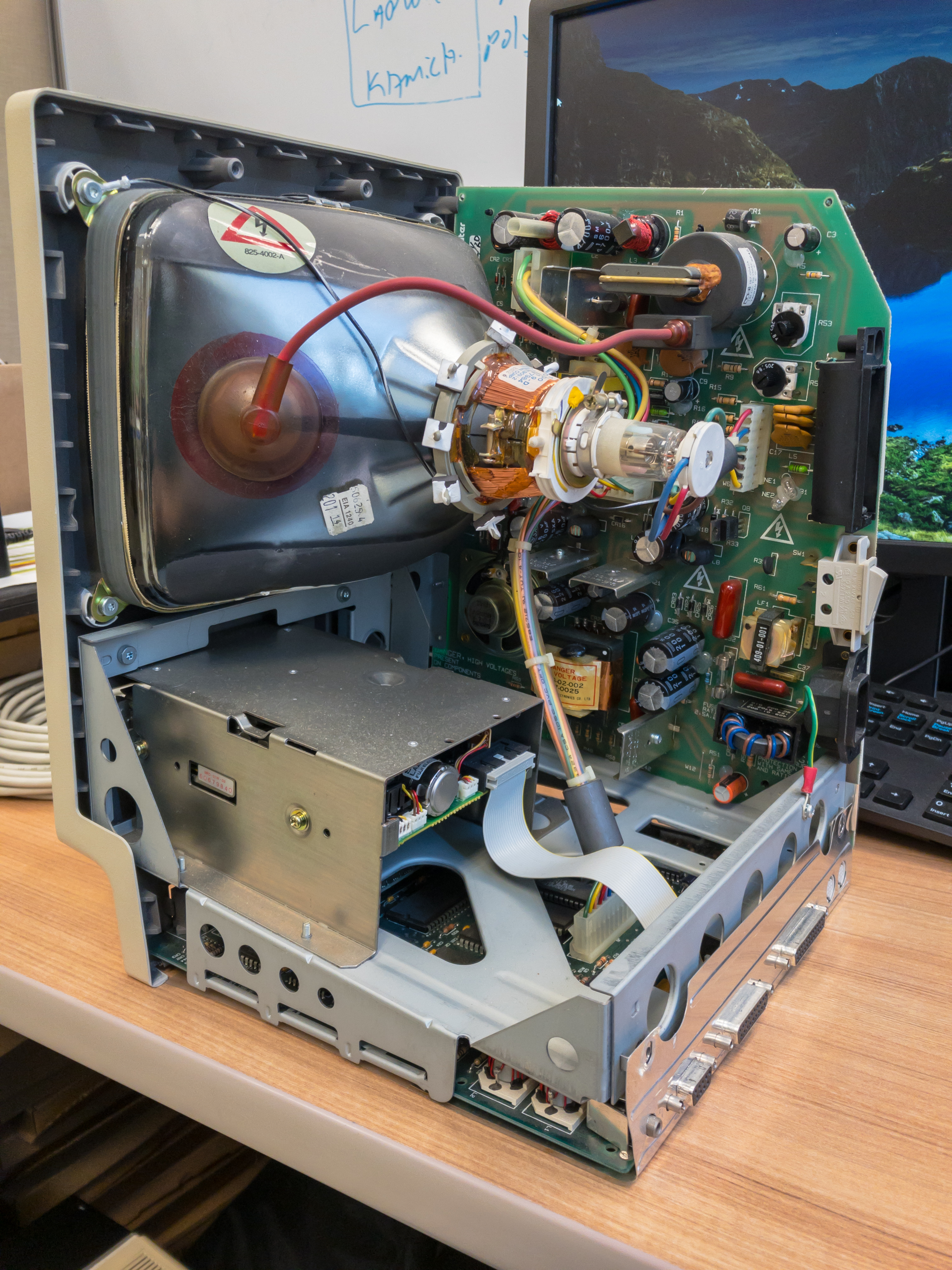
A monochrome CRT as seen inside a Macintosh Plus computer

The body of a CRT is usually made up of three parts: A screen/faceplate/panel, a cone/funnel, and a neck. The joined screen, funnel and neck are known as the bulb or envelope.

The neck is made from a glass tube while the funnel and screen are made by pouring and then pressing glass into a mold. The glass, known as CRT glass or TV glass, needs special properties to shield against x-rays while providing adequate light transmission in the screen or being very electrically insulating in the funnel and neck. The formulation that gives the glass its properties is also known as the melt. The glass is of very high quality, being almost contaminant and defect free. Most of the costs associated with glass production come from the energy used to melt the raw materials into glass. Glass furnaces for CRT glass production have several taps to allow molds to be replaced without stopping the furnace, to allow production of CRTs of several sizes. Only the glass used on the screen needs to have precise optical properties.

The optical properties of the glass used on the screen affect color reproduction and purity in color CRTs. Transmittance, or how transparent the glass is, may be adjusted to be more transparent to certain colors (wavelengths) of light. Transmittance is measured at the center of the screen with a 546 nm wavelength light, and a 10.16mm thick screen. Transmittance goes down with increasing thickness. Standard transmittances for Color CRT screens are 86%, 73%, 57%, 46%, 42% and 30%. Lower transmittances are used to improve image contrast but they put more stress on the electron gun, requiring more power on the electron gun for a higher electron beam power to light the phosphors more brightly to compensate for the reduced transmittance. The transmittance must be uniform across the screen to ensure color purity. The radius (curvature) of screens has increased (grown less curved) over time, from 30 to 68 inches, ultimately evolving into completely flat screens, reducing reflections. The thickness of both curved and flat screens gradually increases from the center outwards, and with it, transmittance is gradually reduced. This means that flat-screen CRTs may not be completely flat on the inside.

The glass used in CRTs arrives from the glass factory to the CRT factory as either separate screens and funnels with flame-fused necks, for Color CRTs, or as bulbs made up of a flame-fused screen, funnel and neck. There were several glass formulations for different types of CRTs, that were classified using codes specific to each glass manufacturer. The compositions of the melts were also specific to each manufacturer. Those optimized for high color purity and contrast were doped with Neodymium, while those for monochrome CRTs were tinted to differing levels, depending on the formulation used and had transmittances of 42% or 30%. Purity is ensuring that the correct colors are activated (for example, ensuring that red is displayed uniformly across the screen) while convergence ensures that images are not distorted. Convergence may be modified using a cross hatch pattern.

CRT glass used to be made by dedicated companies such as AGC Inc., O-I Glass, Samsung Corning Precision Materials, Corning Inc., and Nippon Electric Glass; others such as Videocon, Sony for the US market and Thomson made their own glass.

The funnel and the neck are made of leaded potash-soda glass or lead silicate glass formulation to shield against x-rays generated by high voltage electrons as they decelerate after striking a target, such as the phosphor screen or shadow mask of a color CRT. The velocity of the electrons depends on the anode voltage of the CRT; the higher the voltage, the higher the speed. The amount of x-rays emitted by a CRT can also lowered by reducing the brightness of the image. Leaded glass is used because it is inexpensive, while also shielding heavily against x-rays, although some funnels may also contain barium. The screen is usually instead made out of a special lead-free silicate glass formulation with barium and strontium to shield against x-rays, as it doesn't brown unlike glass containing lead. Another glass formulation uses 2–3% of lead on the screen. Alternatively zirconium can also be used on the screen in combination with barium, instead of lead.

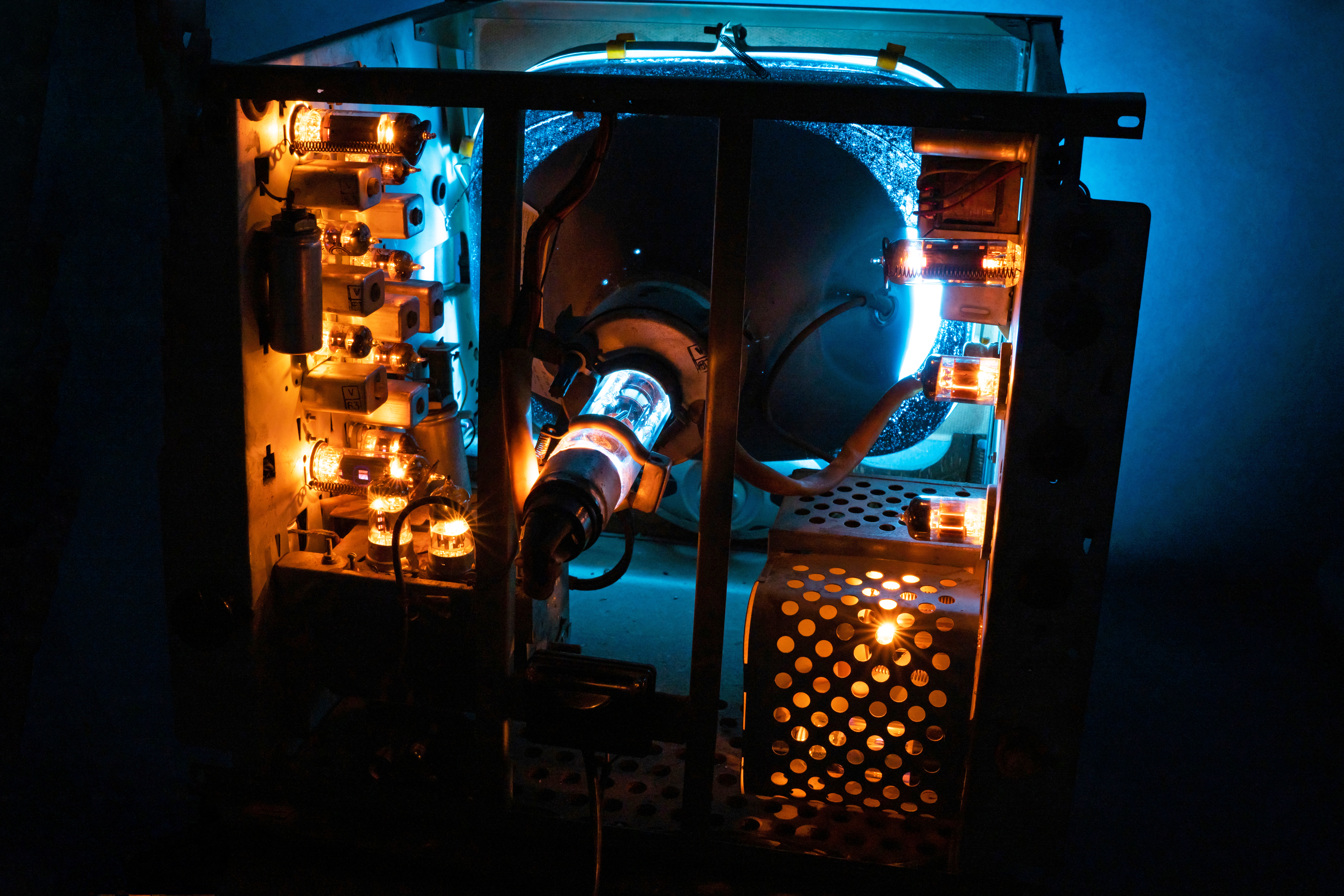
Soviet TV set from 1960s photographed from backside

Monochrome CRTs may have a tinted barium-lead glass formulation in both the screen and funnel, with a potash-soda lead glass in the neck; the potash-soda and barium-lead formulations have different thermal expansion coefficients. The glass used in the neck must be an excellent electrical insulator to contain the voltages used in the electron optics of the electron gun, such as focusing lenses. The lead in the glass causes it to brown (darken) with use due to x-rays, usually the CRT cathode wears out due to cathode poisoning before browning becomes apparent. The glass formulation determines the highest possible anode voltage and hence the maximum possible CRT screen size. For color, maximum voltages are often 24–32 kV, while for monochrome it is usually 21 or 24.5 kV, limiting the size of monochrome CRTs to 21 inches, or ~1 kV per inch. The voltage needed depends on the size and type of CRT. Since the formulations are different, they must be compatible with one another, having similar thermal expansion coefficients. The screen may also have an anti-glare or anti-reflective coating, or be ground to prevent reflections. CRTs may also have an anti-static coating.

The leaded glass in the funnels of CRTs may contain 21–25% of lead oxide (PbO), The neck may contain 30–40% of lead oxide, and the screen may contain 12% of barium oxide, and 12% of strontium oxide. A typical CRT contains several kilograms of lead as lead oxide in the glass depending on its size; 12 inch CRTs contain 0.5 kg of lead in total while 32 inch CRTs contain up to 3 kg. Strontium oxide began being used in CRTs, its major application, in the 1970s. Before this, CRTs used lead on the faceplate.

Some early CRTs used a metal funnel insulated with polyethylene instead of glass with conductive material. Others had ceramic or blown Pyrex instead of pressed glass funnels. Early CRTs did not have a dedicated anode cap connection; the funnel was the anode connection, so it was live during operation.

The funnel is coated on the inside and outside with a conductive coating, making the funnel a capacitor, helping stabilize and filter the anode voltage of the CRT, and significantly reducing the amount of time needed to turn on a CRT. The stability provided by the coating solved problems inherent to early power supply designs, as they used vacuum tubes. Because the funnel is used as a capacitor, the glass used in the funnel must be an excellent electrical insulator (dielectric). The inner coating has a positive voltage (the anode voltage that can be several kV) while the outer coating is connected to ground. CRTs powered by more modern power supplies do not need to be connected to ground, due to the more robust design of modern power supplies. The value of the capacitor formed by the funnel is 5–10 nF, although at the voltage the anode is normally supplied with. The capacitor formed by the funnel can also suffer from dielectric absorption, similarly to other types of capacitors. Because of this CRTs have to be discharged before handling to prevent injury.

The depth of a CRT is related to its screen size. Usual deflection angles were 90° for computer monitor CRTs and small CRTs and 110° which was the standard in larger TV CRTs, with 120 or 125° being used in slim CRTs made since 2001–2005 in an attempt to compete with LCD TVs. Over time, deflection angles increased as they became practical, from 50° in 1938 to 110° in 1959, and 125° in the 2000s. 140° deflection CRTs were researched but never commercialized, as convergence (alignment of red, green, blue electron guns) problems were never resolved.

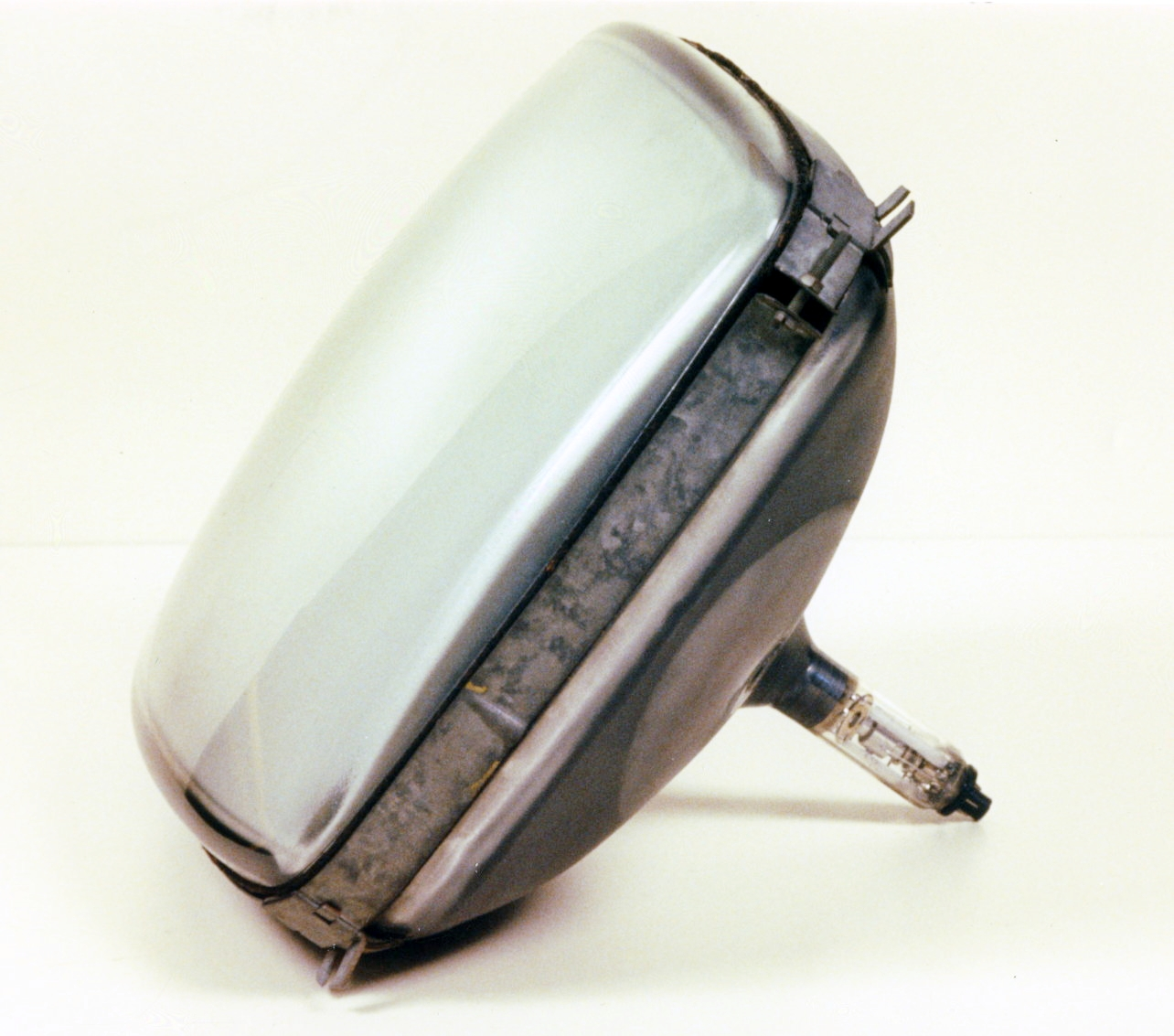
A monochrome CRT with 110° deflection

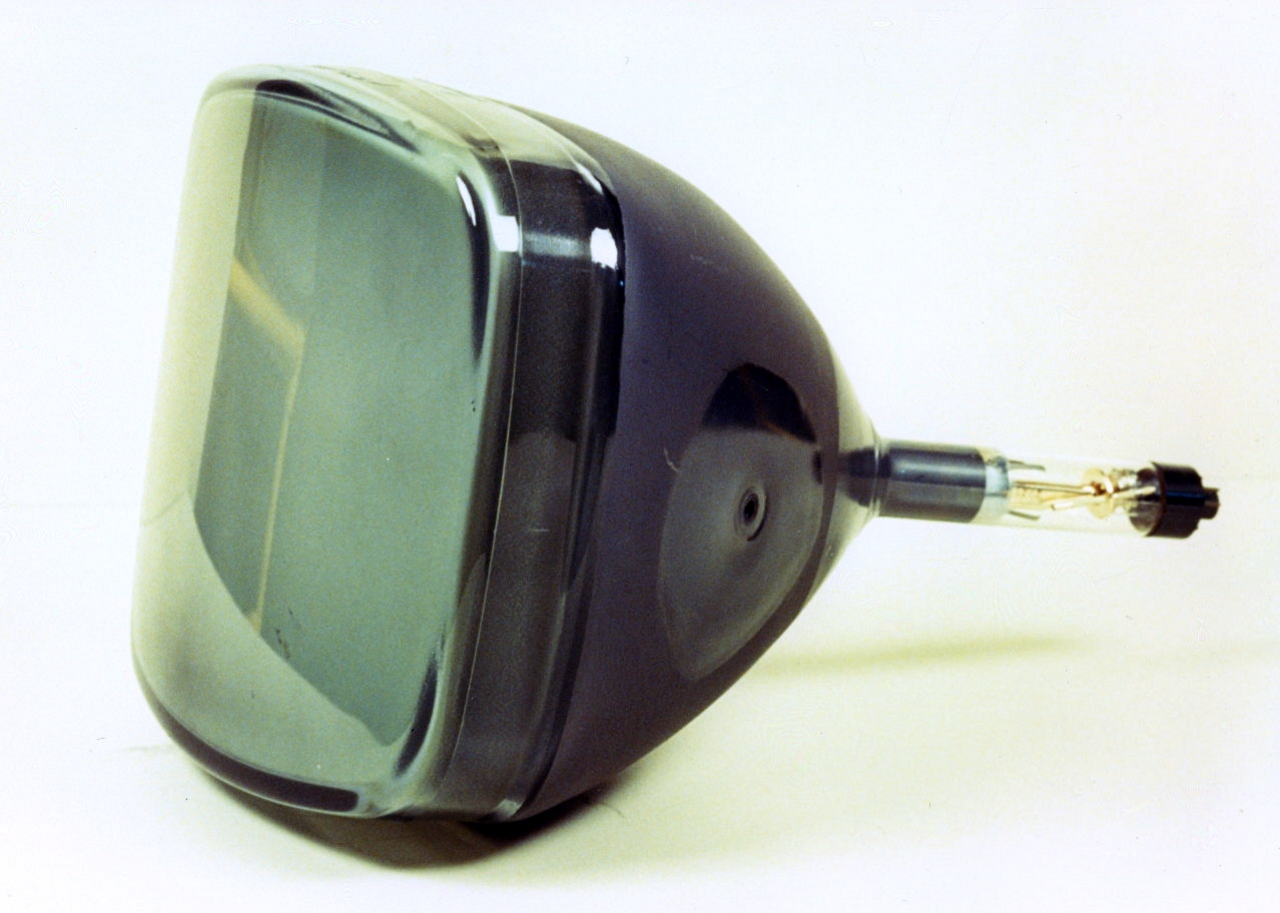
A monochrome CRT with 90° deflection

=== Size and weight ===
The size of a CRT can be measured by the screen's entire area (or face diagonal) or alternatively by only its viewable area (or diagonal) that is coated by phosphor and surrounded by black edges.

While the viewable area may be rectangular, the edges of the CRT may have a curvature (e.g. black stripe CRTs, first made by Toshiba in 1972) or the edges may be black and truly flat (e.g. Flatron CRTs), or the viewable area may follow the curvature of the edges of the CRT (with or without black edges or curved edges).

Small CRTs below 3 inches were made for handheld TVs such as the MTV-1 and viewfinders in camcorders. In these, there may be no black edges, that are however truly flat.

Most of the weight of a CRT comes from the thick glass screen, which comprises 65% of the total weight of a CRT and limits its practical size (see § Size). The funnel and neck glass comprise the remaining 30% and 5% respectively. The glass in the funnel can vary in thickness, to join the thin neck with the thick screen. Chemically or thermally tempered glass may be used to reduce the weight of the CRT glass.

=== Anode ===
The outer conductive coating is connected to ground while the inner conductive coating is connected using the anode button/cap through a series of capacitors and diodes (a Cockcroft–Walton generator) to the high voltage flyback transformer; the inner coating is the anode of the CRT, which, together with an electrode in the electron gun, is also known as the final anode. The inner coating is connected to the electrode using springs. The electrode forms part of a bipotential lens. The capacitors and diodes serve as a voltage multiplier for the current delivered by the flyback.

The anode is used to accelerate the electrons towards the screen and also collects the secondary electrons that are emitted by the phosphor particles in the vacuum of the CRT.

For the inner funnel coating, monochrome CRTs use aluminum while color CRTs use aquadag; Some CRTs may use iron oxide on the inside. On the outside, most CRTs use aquadag. Aquadag is an electrically conductive graphite-based paint. In color CRTs, the aquadag is sprayed onto the interior of the funnel whereas historically aquadag was painted into the interior of monochrome CRTs.

The anode cap connection in modern CRTs must be able to handle up to 55–60kV depending on the size and brightness of the CRT. Higher voltages allow for larger CRTs, higher image brightness, or a tradeoff between the two. It consists of a metal clip that expands on the inside of an anode button that is embedded on the funnel glass of the CRT. The connection is insulated by a silicone suction cup, possibly also using silicone grease to prevent corona discharge.

The anode button must be specially shaped to establish a hermetic seal between the button and funnel. X-rays may leak through the anode button, although that may not be the case in newer CRTs starting from the late 1970s to early 1980s, thanks to a new button and clip design. The button may consist of a set of 3 nested cups, with the outermost cup being made of a Nickel–Chromium–Iron alloy containing 40–49% of Nickel and 3–6% of Chromium to make the button easy to fuse to the funnel glass, with a first inner cup made of thick inexpensive iron to shield against x-rays, and with the second innermost cup also being made of iron or any other electrically conductive metal to connect to the clip. The cups must be heat resistant enough and have similar thermal expansion coefficients similar to that of the funnel glass to withstand being fused to the funnel glass. The inner side of the button is connected to the inner conductive coating of the CRT. The anode button may be attached to the funnel while its being pressed into shape in a mold. Alternatively, the x-ray shielding may instead be built into the clip.

The flyback transformer is also known as an IHVT (Integrated High Voltage Transformer) if it includes a voltage multiplier. The flyback uses a ceramic or powdered iron core to enable efficient operation at high frequencies. The flyback contains one primary and many secondary windings that provide several different voltages. The main secondary winding supplies the voltage multiplier with voltage pulses to ultimately supply the CRT with the high anode voltage it uses, while the remaining windings supply the CRT's filament voltage, keying pulses, focus voltage and voltages derived from the scan raster. When the transformer is turned off, the flyback's magnetic field quickly collapses which induces high voltage in its windings. The speed at which the magnetic field collapses determines the voltage that is induced, so the voltage increases alongside its speed. A capacitor (Retrace Timing Capacitor) or series of capacitors (to provide redundancy) is used to slow the collapse of the magnetic field.

The design of the high voltage power supply in a product using a CRT has an influence in the amount of x-rays emitted by the CRT. The amount of emitted x-rays increases with both higher voltages and currents. If the product such as a TV set uses an unregulated high voltage power supply, meaning that anode and focus voltage go down with increasing electron current when displaying a bright image, the amount of emitted x-rays is as its highest when the CRT is displaying a moderately bright images, since when displaying dark or bright images, the higher anode voltage counteracts the lower electron beam current and vice versa respectively. The high voltage regulator and rectifier vacuum tubes in some old CRT TV sets may also emit x-rays.

=== Electron gun ===
The electron gun emits the electrons that ultimately hit the phosphors on the screen of the CRT. The electron gun contains a heater, which heats a cathode, which generates electrons that, using grids, are focused and ultimately accelerated into the screen of the CRT. The acceleration occurs in conjunction with the inner aluminum or aquadag coating of the CRT. The electron gun is positioned so that it aims at the center of the screen. It is inside the neck of the CRT, and it is held together and mounted to the neck using glass beads or glass support rods, which are the glass strips on the electron gun. The electron gun is made separately and then placed inside the neck through a process called "winding", or sealing. The electron gun has a glass wafer that is fused to the neck of the CRT. The connections to the electron gun penetrate the glass wafer. Once the electron gun is inside the neck, its metal parts (grids) are arced between each other using high voltage to smooth any rough edges in a process called spot knocking, to prevent the rough edges in the grids from generating secondary electrons.

==== Construction and method of operation ====
The electron gun has an indirectly heated hot cathode that is heated by a tungsten filament heating element; the heater may draw 0.5–2 A of current depending on the CRT. The voltage applied to the heater can affect the life of the CRT. Heating the cathode energizes the electrons in it, aiding electron emission, while at the same time current is supplied to the cathode; typically anywhere from 140 mA at 1.5 V to 600 mA at 6.3 V. The cathode emits low energy electrons, which are accelerated and focused into an electron beam. Color CRTs have three cathodes: one for red, green and blue. The heater sits inside the cathode but does not touch it; the cathode has its own separate electrical connection. The cathode is a material coated onto a piece of nickel which provides the electrical connection and structural support; the heater sits inside this piece without touching it.

There are several short circuits that can occur in a CRT electron gun. One is a heater-to-cathode short, that causes the cathode to permanently emit electrons which may cause an image with a bright red, green or blue tint with retrace lines, depending on the cathode (s) affected. Alternatively, the cathode may short to the control grid, possibly causing similar effects, or, the control grid and screen grid (G2) can short causing a very dark image or no image at all. The cathode may be surrounded by a shield to prevent sputtering.

The cathode is a layer of barium oxide which is coated on a piece of nickel for electrical and mechanical support. The barium oxide must be activated by heating to enable it to release electrons. Activation is necessary because barium oxide is not stable in air, so it is applied to the cathode as barium carbonate, which cannot emit electrons. Activation heats the barium carbonate to decompose it into barium oxide and carbon dioxide while forming a thin layer of metallic barium on the cathode. Activation is done when forming the vacuum (described in § Evacuation). After activation, the oxide can become damaged by several common gases such as water vapor, carbon dioxide, and oxygen. Alternatively, barium strontium calcium carbonate may be used instead of barium carbonate, yielding barium, strontium and calcium oxides after activation. During operation, the barium oxide is heated to 800–1000 °C, at which point it starts shedding electrons.

Since it is a hot cathode, it is prone to cathode poisoning, which is the formation of a positive ion layer that prevents the cathode from emitting electrons, reducing image brightness significantly or completely and causing focus and intensity to be affected by the frequency of the video signal preventing detailed images from being displayed by the CRT. The positive ions come from leftover air molecules inside the CRT or from the cathode itself that react over time with the surface of the hot cathode. Reducing metals such as manganese, zirconium, magnesium, aluminum or titanium may be added to the piece of nickel to lengthen the life of the cathode, as during activation, the reducing metals diffuse into the barium oxide, improving its lifespan, especially at high electron beam currents. In color CRTs with red, green and blue cathodes, one or more cathodes may be affected independently of the others, causing total or partial loss of one or more colors. CRTs can wear or burn out due to cathode poisoning. Cathode poisoning is accelerated by increased cathode current (overdriving). In color CRTs, since there are three cathodes, one for red, green and blue, a single or more poisoned cathode may cause the partial or complete loss of one or more colors, tinting the image. The layer may also act as a capacitor in series with the cathode, inducing thermal lag. The cathode may instead be made of scandium oxide or incorporate it as a dopant, to delay cathode poisoning, extending the life of the cathode by up to 15%.

The rate of emission of electrons from the cathodes is related to their surface area. A cathode with more surface area creates more electrons, in a larger electron cloud, which makes focusing the electron cloud into an electron beam more difficult. Normally, only a part of the cathode emits electrons unless the CRT displays images with parts that are at full image brightness; only the parts at full brightness cause all of the cathode to emit electrons. The area of the cathode that emits electrons grows from the center outwards as brightness increases, so cathode wear may be uneven. When only the center of the cathode is worn, the CRT may light brightly those parts of images that have full image brightness but not show darker parts of images at all, in such a case the CRT displays a poor gamma characteristic.

A voltage negative with respect to the cathode is applied to the first (control) grid (G1) to control the emission of electrons into the rest of the electron gun. G1 in practice is a Wehnelt cylinder. The brightness of the image on the screen depends on both the anode voltage and the electron beam current and in practise the latter is constant, while the former is controlled by varying the difference in voltage between the cathode and the G1 control grid. The second (screen) grid of the gun (G2) then accelerates the electrons towards the screen using several hundred DC volts. Then a third grid (G3) electrostatically focuses the electron beam before it is deflected and later accelerated by the anode voltage onto the screen. Electrostatic focusing of the electron beam may be accomplished using an einzel lens energized at up to 600 volts. Before electrostatic focusing, focusing the electron beam required a large, heavy and complex mechanical focusing system placed outside the electron gun.

However, electrostatic focusing cannot be accomplished near the final anode of the CRT due to its high voltage in the dozens of Kilovolts, so a high voltage (≈600–8000 V) electrode, together with an electrode at the final anode voltage of the CRT, may be used for focusing instead. Such an arrangement is called a bipotential lens, which also offers higher performance than an einzel lens, or, focusing may be accomplished using a magnetic focusing coil together with a high anode voltage of dozens of kilovolts. However, magnetic focusing is expensive to implement, so it is rarely used in practice. Some CRTs may use two grids and lenses to focus the electron beam. The focus voltage is generated in the flyback using a subset of the flyback's high voltage winding in conjunction with a resistive voltage divider. The focus electrode is connected alongside the other connections that are in the neck of the CRT.

There is a voltage called cutoff voltage which is the voltage that creates black on the screen since it causes the image on the screen created by the electron beam to disappear, the voltage is applied to G1. In a color CRT with three guns, the guns have different cutoff voltages. Many CRTs share grid G1 and G2 across all three guns, increasing image brightness and simplifying adjustment since on such CRTs there is a single cutoff voltage for all three guns (since G1 is shared across all guns). but placing additional stress on the video amplifier used to feed video into the electron gun's cathodes, since the cutoff voltage becomes higher. Monochrome CRTs do not suffer from this problem. In monochrome CRTs video is fed to the gun by varying the voltage on the first control grid.

During retracing of the electron beam, the preamplifier that feeds the video amplifier is disabled and the video amplifier is biased to a voltage higher than the cutoff voltage to prevent retrace lines from showing, or G1 can have a large negative voltage applied to it to prevent electrons from getting out of the cathode. This is known as blanking. (see Vertical blanking interval and Horizontal blanking interval.) Incorrect biasing can lead to visible retrace lines on one or more colors, creating retrace lines that are tinted or white (for example, tinted red if the red color is affected, tinted magenta if the red and blue colors are affected, and white if all colors are affected). Alternatively, the amplifier may be driven by a video processor that also introduces an OSD (On Screen Display) into the video stream that is fed into the amplifier, using a fast blanking signal. TV sets and computer monitors that incorporate CRTs need a DC restoration circuit to provide a video signal to the CRT with a DC component, restoring the original brightness of different parts of the image.

The electron beam may be affected by the Earth's magnetic field, causing it to normally enter the focusing lens off-center; this can be corrected using astigmation controls. Astigmation controls are both magnetic and electronic (dynamic); magnetic does most of the work while electronic is used for fine adjustments. One of the ends of the electron gun has a glass disk, the edges of which are fused with the edge of the neck of the CRT, possibly using frit; the metal leads that connect the electron gun to the outside pass through the disk.

Some electron guns have a quadrupole lens with dynamic focus to alter the shape and adjust the focus of the electron beam, varying the focus voltage depending on the position of the electron beam to maintain image sharpness across the entire screen, specially at the corners. They may also have a bleeder resistor to derive voltages for the grids from the final anode voltage.

After the CRTs were manufactured, they were aged to allow cathode emission to stabilize.

The electron guns in color CRTs are driven by a video amplifier which takes a signal per color channel and amplifies it to 40–170 V per channel, to be fed into the electron gun's cathodes; each electron gun has its own channel (one per color) and all channels may be driven by the same amplifier, which internally has three separate channels. The amplifier's capabilities limit the resolution, refresh rate and contrast ratio of the CRT, as the amplifier needs to provide high bandwidth and voltage variations at the same time; higher resolutions and refresh rates need higher bandwidths (speed at which voltage can be varied and thus switching between black and white) and higher contrast ratios need higher voltage variations or amplitude for lower black and higher white levels. 30 MHz of bandwidth can usually provide 720p or 1080i resolution, while 20 MHz usually provides around 600 (horizontal, from top to bottom) lines of resolution, for example. The difference in voltage between the cathode and the control grid is what modulates the electron beam, modulating its current and thus creating shades of colors which create the image line by line and this can also affect the brightness of the image. The phosphors used in color CRTs produce different amounts of light for a given amount of energy, so to produce white on a color CRT, all three guns must output differing amounts of energy. The gun that outputs the most energy is the red gun since the red phosphor emits the least amount of light.

==== Gamma ====
CRTs have a pronounced triode characteristic, which results in significant gamma (a nonlinear relationship in an electron gun between applied video voltage and beam intensity).

=== Deflection ===
There are two types of deflection: magnetic and electrostatic. Magnetic is usually used in TVs and monitors as it allows for higher deflection angles (and hence shallower CRTs) and deflection power (which allows for higher electron beam current and hence brighter images) while avoiding the need for high voltages for deflection of up to 2 kV, while oscilloscopes often use electrostatic deflection since the raw waveforms captured by the oscilloscope can be applied directly (after amplification) to the vertical electrostatic deflection plates inside the CRT.

==== Magnetic deflection ====
Those that use magnetic deflection may use a yoke that has two pairs of deflection coils; one pair for vertical, and another for horizontal deflection. The yoke can be bonded (be integral) or removable. Those that were bonded used glue or a plastic to bond the yoke to the area between the neck and the funnel of the CRT while those with removable yokes are clamped. The yoke generates heat whose removal is essential since the conductivity of glass goes up with increasing temperature, the glass needs to be insulating for the CRT to remain usable as a capacitor. The temperature of the glass below the yoke is thus checked during the design of a new yoke. The yoke contains the deflection and convergence coils with a ferrite core to reduce loss of magnetic force as well as the magnetized rings used to align or adjust the electron beams in color CRTs (The color purity and convergence rings, for example) and monochrome CRTs. The yoke may be connected using a connector, the order in which the deflection coils of the yoke are connected determines the orientation of the image displayed by the CRT. The deflection coils may be held in place using polyurethane glue.

The deflection coils are driven by sawtooth signals that may be delivered through VGA as horizontal and vertical sync signals. A CRT needs two deflection circuits: a horizontal and a vertical circuit, which are similar except that the horizontal circuit runs at a much higher frequency (a Horizontal scan rate) of 15–240 kHz depending on the refresh rate of the CRT and the number of horizontal lines to be drawn (the vertical resolution of the CRT). The higher frequency makes it more susceptible to interference, so an automatic frequency control (AFC) circuit may be used to lock the phase of the horizontal deflection signal to that of a sync signal, to prevent the image from becoming distorted diagonally. The vertical frequency varies according to the refresh rate of the CRT. So a CRT with a 60 Hz refresh rate has a vertical deflection circuit running at 60 Hz. The horizontal and vertical deflection signals may be generated using two circuits that work differently; the horizontal deflection signal may be generated using a voltage controlled oscillator (VCO) while the vertical signal may be generated using a triggered relaxation oscillator. In many TVs, the frequencies at which the deflection coils run is in part determined by the inductance value of the coils. CRTs had differing deflection angles; the higher the deflection angle, the shallower the CRT for a given screen size, but at the cost of more deflection power and lower optical performance.

Higher deflection power means more current is sent to the deflection coils to bend the electron beam at a higher angle, which in turn may generate more heat or require electronics that can handle the increased power. Heat is generated due to resistive and core losses. The deflection power is measured in mA per inch. The vertical deflection coils may require ~24 volts while the horizontal deflection coils require ~120 volts to operate.

The deflection coils are driven by deflection amplifiers. The horizontal deflection coils may also be driven in part by the horizontal output stage of a TV set. The stage contains a capacitor that is in series with the horizontal deflection coils that performs several functions, among them are: shaping the sawtooth deflection signal to match the curvature of the CRT and centering the image by preventing a DC bias from developing on the coil. At the beginning of retrace, the magnetic field of the coil collapses, causing the electron beam to return to the center of the screen, while at the same time the coil returns energy into capacitors, the energy of which is then used to force the electron beam to go to the left of the screen.

Due to the high frequency at which the horizontal deflection coils operate, the energy in the deflection coils must be recycled to reduce heat dissipation. Recycling is done by transferring the energy in the deflection coils' magnetic field to a set of capacitors. The voltage on the horizontal deflection coils is negative when the electron beam is on the left side of the screen and positive when the electron beam is on the right side of the screen. The energy required for deflection is dependent on the energy of the electrons. Higher energy (voltage and/or current) electron beams need more energy to be deflected, and are used to achieve higher image brightness.

==== Electrostatic deflection ====
Mostly used in oscilloscopes. Deflection is carried out by applying a voltage across two pairs of plates, one for horizontal, and the other for vertical deflection. The electron beam is steered by varying the voltage difference across plates in a pair; For example, applying a voltage to the upper plate of the vertical deflection pair, while keeping the voltage in the bottom plate at 0 volts, will cause the electron beam to be deflected towards the upper part of the screen; increasing the voltage in the upper plate while keeping the bottom plate at 0 will cause the electron beam to be deflected to a higher point in the screen (will cause the beam to be deflected at a higher deflection angle). The same applies with the horizontal deflection plates. Increasing the length and proximity between plates in a pair can also increase the deflection angle.

=== Burn-in ===
Burn-in is when images are physically "burned" into the screen of the CRT; this occurs due to degradation of the phosphors due to prolonged electron bombardment of the phosphors, and happens when a fixed image or logo is left for too long on the screen, causing it to appear as a "ghost" image or, in severe cases, also when the CRT is off. To counter this, screensavers were used in computers to minimize burn-in.

=== Evacuation ===
The CRT's partial vacuum of 0.01 pascals (1×10^{−7} atm) to 0.1 micropascals (1×10^{−12} atm) or less is evacuated or exhausted in a ~375–475 °C oven in a process called baking or bake-out. The evacuation process also outgasses any materials inside the CRT, while decomposing others such as the polyvinyl alcohol (PVA) used to apply the phosphors. The heating and cooling are done gradually to avoid inducing stress, stiffening and possibly cracking the glass; the oven heats the gases inside the CRT, increasing the speed of the gas molecules which increases the chances of them getting drawn out by the vacuum pump. The temperature of the CRT is kept to below that of the oven, and the oven starts to cool just after the CRT reaches 400 °C, or, the CRT was kept at a temperature higher than 400 °C for up to 15–55 minutes. The CRT was heated during or after evacuation, and the heat may have been used simultaneously to melt the frit in the CRT, joining the screen and funnel. The pump used is a turbomolecular pump or a diffusion pump. Formerly mercury vacuum pumps were also used. After baking, the CRT is disconnected ("sealed or tipped off") from the vacuum pump. The getter is then fired using an RF (induction) coil. The getter is usually in the funnel or in the neck of the CRT. The getter material which is often barium-based, catches any remaining gas particles as it evaporates due to heating induced by the RF coil (that may be combined with exothermic heating within the material); the vapor fills the CRT, trapping any gas molecules that it encounters and condenses on the inside of the CRT forming a layer that contains trapped gas molecules. Hydrogen may be present in the material to help distribute the barium vapor. The material is heated to temperatures above 1000 °C, causing it to evaporate. Partial loss of vacuum in a CRT can result in a hazy image, blue glowing in the neck of the CRT, flashovers, loss of cathode emission or focusing problems.

=== Rebuilding ===
CRTs used to be rebuilt; repaired or refurbished. The rebuilding process included the disassembly of the CRT, the disassembly and repair or replacement of the electron gun(s), the removal and redeposition of phosphors and aquadag, etc. Rebuilding was popular until the 1960s because CRTs were expensive and wore out quickly, making repair worth it. The last CRT rebuilder in the US closed in 2010, and the last in Europe, RACS, which was located in France, closed in 2013.

=== Reactivation ===
Reactivation, also known as rejuvenation, is a process with the goal of temporarily restoring the brightness of a worn CRT. This is often done by carefully increasing the voltage on the cathode heater and the current and voltage on the control grids of the electron gun manually. Some rejuvenators can also fix heater-to-cathode shorts by running a capacitive discharge through the short.

=== Phosphors ===
Phosphors in CRTs emit secondary electrons due to them being inside the vacuum of the CRT. The secondary electrons are collected by the anode of the CRT. Secondary electrons generated by phosphors need to be collected to prevent charges from developing in the screen, which would lead to reduced image brightness since the charge would repel the electron beam.

The phosphors used in CRTs often contain rare earth metals, replacing earlier dimmer phosphors. Early red and green phosphors contained Cadmium, and some black and white CRT phosphors also contained beryllium in the form of Zinc beryllium silicate, although white phosphors containing cadmium, zinc and magnesium with silver, copper or manganese as dopants were also used. The rare earth phosphors used in CRTs are more efficient (produce more light) than earlier phosphors. The phosphors adhere to the screen because of Van der Waals and electrostatic forces. Phosphors composed of smaller particles adhere more strongly to the screen. The phosphors together with the carbon used to prevent light bleeding (in color CRTs) can be easily removed by scratching.

Several dozen types of phosphors were available for CRTs. Phosphors were classified according to color, persistence, luminance rise and fall curves, color depending on anode voltage (for phosphors used in penetration CRTs), Intended use, chemical composition, safety, sensitivity to burn-in, and secondary emission properties. Examples of rare earth phosphors are yttrium oxide for red and yttrium silicide for blue in beam index tubes, while examples of earlier phosphors are copper cadmium sulfide for red,

SMPTE-C phosphors have properties defined by the SMPTE-C standard, which defines a color space of the same name. The standard prioritizes accurate color reproduction, which was made difficult by the different phosphors and color spaces used in the NTSC and PAL color systems. PAL TV sets have subjectively better color reproduction due to the use of saturated green phosphors, which have relatively long decay times that are tolerated in PAL since there is more time in PAL for phosphors to decay, due to its lower framerate. SMPTE-C phosphors were used in professional video monitors.

The phosphor coating on monochrome and color CRTs may have an aluminum coating on its rear side used to reflect light forward, provide protection against ions to prevent ion burn by negative ions on the phosphor, manage heat generated by electrons colliding against the phosphor, prevent static build up that could repel electrons from the screen, form part of the anode and collect the secondary electrons generated by the phosphors in the screen after being hit by the electron beam, providing the electrons with a return path. The electron beam passes through the aluminum coating before hitting the phosphors on the screen; the aluminum attenuates the electron beam voltage by about 1 kV. A film or lacquer may be applied to the phosphors to reduce the surface roughness of the surface formed by the phosphors to allow the aluminum coating to have a uniform surface and prevent it from touching the glass of the screen. This is known as filming. The lacquer contains solvents that are later evaporated; the lacquer may be chemically roughened to cause an aluminum coating with holes to be created to allow the solvents to escape.

==== Phosphor persistence ====
Various phosphors are available depending upon the needs of the measurement or display application. The brightness, color, and persistence of the illumination depends upon the type of phosphor used on the CRT screen. Phosphors are available with persistences ranging from less than one microsecond to several seconds. For visual observation of brief transient events, a long persistence phosphor may be desirable. For events which are fast and repetitive, or high frequency, a short-persistence phosphor is generally preferable. The phosphor persistence must be low enough to avoid smearing or ghosting artifacts at high refresh rates.

=== Limitations and workarounds ===
==== Blooming ====
Variations in anode voltage can lead to variations in brightness in parts or all of the image, in addition to blooming, shrinkage or the image getting zoomed in or out. Lower voltages lead to blooming and zooming in, while higher voltages do the opposite. Some blooming is unavoidable, which can be seen as bright areas of an image that expand, distorting or pushing aside surrounding darker areas of the same image. Blooming occurs because bright areas have a higher electron beam current from the electron gun, making the beam wider and harder to focus. Poor voltage regulation causes focus and anode voltage to go down with increasing electron beam current.

==== Doming ====
Doming is a phenomenon found on some CRT TVs in which parts of the shadow mask become heated. In TVs that exhibit this behavior, it tends to occur in high-contrast scenes in which there is a largely dark scene with one or more localized bright spots. As the electron beam hits the shadow mask in these areas it heats unevenly. The shadow mask warps due to the heat differences, which causes the electron gun to hit the wrong colored phosphors and incorrect colors to be displayed in the affected area. Thermal expansion causes the shadow mask to expand by around 100 microns.

During normal operation, the shadow mask is heated to around 80–90 °C. Bright areas of images heat the shadow mask more than dark areas, leading to uneven heating of the shadow mask and warping (blooming) due to thermal expansion caused by heating by increased electron beam current. The shadow mask is usually made of steel but it can be made of Invar (a low-thermal expansion Nickel-Iron alloy) as it withstands two to three times more current than conventional masks without noticeable warping, while making higher resolution CRTs easier to achieve. Coatings that dissipate heat may be applied on the shadow mask to limit blooming in a process called blackening.

Bimetal springs may be used in CRTs used in TVs to compensate for warping that occurs as the electron beam heats the shadow mask, causing thermal expansion. The shadow mask is installed to the screen using metal pieces or a rail or frame that is fused to the funnel or the screen glass respectively, holding the shadow mask in tension to minimize warping (if the mask is flat, used in flat-screen CRT computer monitors) and allowing for higher image brightness and contrast.

Aperture grille screens are brighter since they allow more electrons through. They are also more resistant to warping. Color CRTs need higher anode voltages than monochrome CRTs to achieve the same brightness since the shadow mask blocks most of the electron beam. Slot masks and specially Aperture grilles do not block as many electrons resulting in a brighter image for a given anode voltage, but aperture grille CRTs are heavier. Shadow masks block 80–85% of the electron beam while Aperture grilles allow more electrons to pass through.

==== High voltage ====
Image brightness is related to the anode voltage and to the CRTs size, so higher voltages are needed for both larger screens and higher image brightness. Image brightness is also controlled by the current of the electron beam. Higher anode voltages and electron beam currents also mean higher amounts of x-rays and heat generation since the electrons have a higher speed and energy. Leaded glass and special barium-strontium glass are used to block most x-ray emissions.

==== Size ====
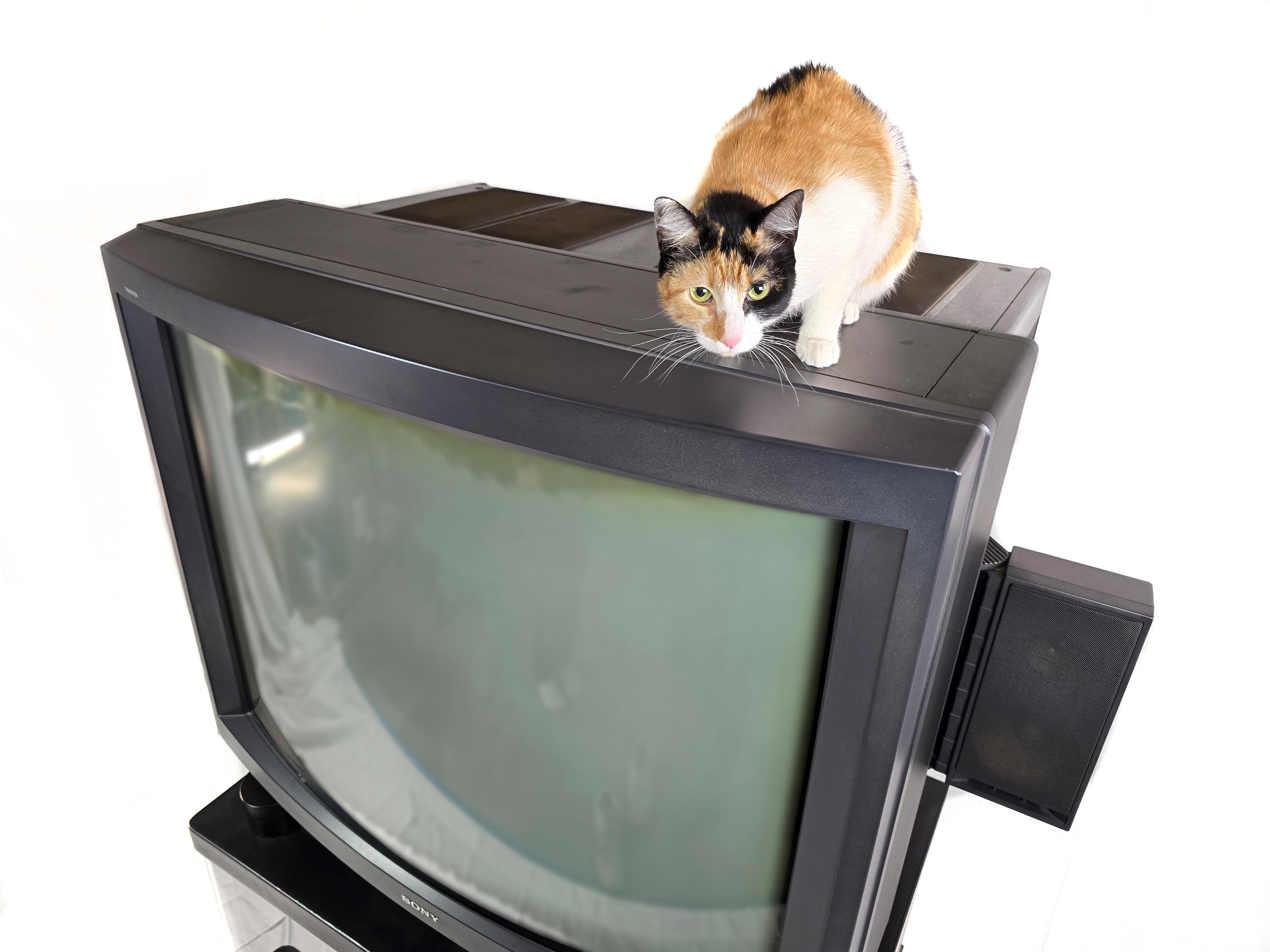
Top view of Sony PVM-4300 with a cat for scale (The average house cat is 18 inches long, not including tail.)

A practical limit on the size of a CRT is the weight of the thick glass needed to safely sustain its vacuum, since a CRT's exterior is exposed to the full atmospheric pressure, which for instance totals 5,800 pounds-force (26,000 N) on a 27-inch (400 in^{2}) screen. For example, the large 43-inch Sony PVM-4300 weighs 440 lb or 200 kg, much heavier than 32-inch CRTs (up to 163 lb or 74 kg) and 19-inch CRTs (up to 60 lb or 27 kg). Much lighter flat panel TVs are only ~18 lb (8.2 kg) for 32-inch and 6.5 lb (2.9 kg) for 19-inch.

Size is also limited by anode voltage, as it would require a higher dielectric strength to prevent arcing and the electrical losses and ozone generation it causes, without sacrificing image brightness.

Shadow masks also become more difficult to make with increasing resolution and size.

==== Limits imposed by deflection ====
At high deflection angles, resolutions, and refresh rates (since higher resolutions and refresh rates require significantly higher frequencies to be applied to the horizontal deflection coils), the deflection yoke starts to produce large amounts of heat, due to the need to move the electron beam at a higher angle, which in turn requires increasingly larger amounts of power. As an example, to increase the deflection angle from 90 to 120°, power consumption of the yoke must also go up from 40 watts to 80 watts, and to increase it further from 120 to 150°, deflection power must again go up from 80 to 160 watts. This normally makes CRTs that go beyond certain deflection angles, resolutions and refresh rates impractical, since the coils would generate too much heat due to resistance caused by the skin effect, surface and eddy current losses, and/or possibly causing the glass underneath the coil to become conductive (as the electrical conductivity of glass increases with increasing temperature). Some deflection yokes are designed to dissipate the heat that comes from their operation. Higher deflection angles in color CRTs directly affect convergence at the corners of the screen which requires additional compensation circuitry to handle electron beam power and shape, leading to higher costs and power consumption. Higher deflection angles allow a CRT of a given size to be slimmer, however they also impose more stress on the CRT envelope, specially on the panel, the seal between the panel and funnel and on the funnel. The funnel needs to be long enough to minimize stress, as a longer funnel can be better shaped to have lower stress.

== Comparison with other technologies ==
One of the defining points of comparison

- LCD advantages over CRT: Lower bulk, power consumption and heat generation, higher refresh rates (up to 360 Hz)
- CRT advantages over LCD: Better color reproduction, no motion blur, multisyncing available in many monitors, no input lag
- OLED advantages over CRT: Lower bulk, similar color reproduction, higher contrast ratios, similar refresh rates (over 60 Hz, up to 120 Hz) except for computer monitors.

On CRTs, refresh rates depend on resolution, both of which are ultimately limited by the maximum horizontal scanning frequency of the CRT. Motion blur also depends on the decay time of the phosphors. Phosphors that decay too slowly for a given refresh rate may cause smearing or motion blur on the image. In practice, CRTs are limited to a refresh rate of 160 Hz. LCDs that can compete with OLED (Dual Layer, and mini-LED LCDs) are not available in high refresh rates, although quantum dot LCDs (QLEDs) are available in high refresh rates (up to 144 Hz) and are competitive in color reproduction with OLEDs.

CRT monitors can still outperform LCD and OLED monitors in input lag, as there is no signal processing between the CRT and the display connector of the monitor, since CRT monitors often use VGA which provides an analog signal that can be fed to a CRT directly. Video cards designed for use with CRTs may have a RAMDAC to generate the analog signals needed by the CRT. Also, CRT monitors are often capable of displaying sharp images at several resolutions, an ability known as multisyncing. Due to these reasons, CRTs are often preferred for playing video games made in the early 2000s and prior in spite of their bulk, weight and heat generation, with some pieces of technology requiring a CRT to function due to not being built with the functionality of modern displays in mind.

CRTs tend to be more durable than their flat panel counterparts, though specialised LCDs that have similar durability also exist.

== Types ==
CRTs were produced in two major categories, picture tubes and display tubes. Picture tubes were used in TVs while display tubes were used in computer monitors. Display tubes were of higher resolution and when used in computer monitors sometimes had adjustable overscan, or sometimes underscan. Picture tube CRTs have overscan, meaning the actual edges of the image are not shown; this is deliberate to allow for adjustment variations between CRT TVs, preventing the ragged edges (due to blooming) of the image from being shown on screen. The shadow mask may have grooves that reflect away the electrons that do not hit the screen due to overscan. Color picture tubes used in TVs were also known as CPTs. CRTs are also sometimes called Braun tubes.

=== Monochrome CRTs ===
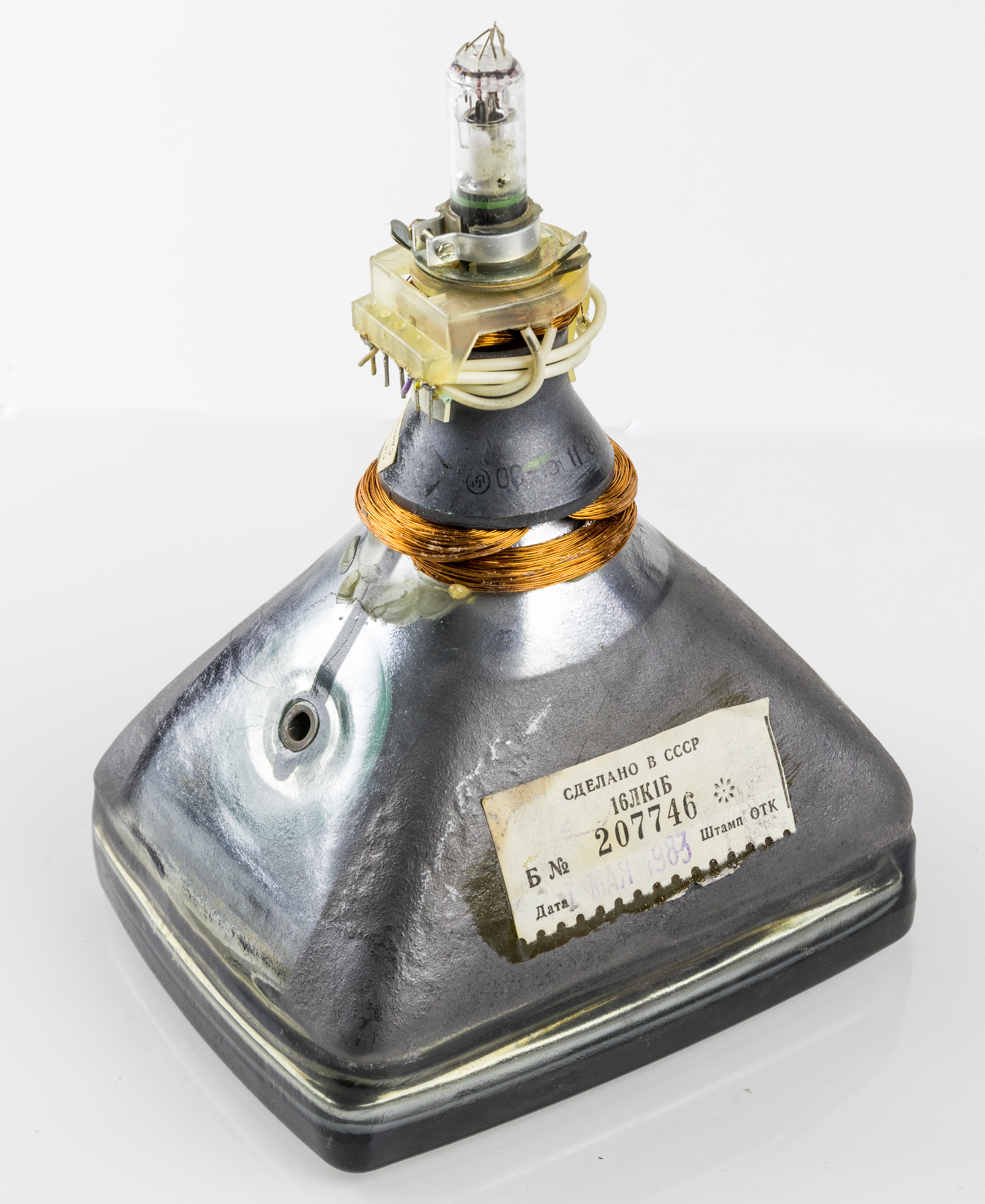
An aluminized monochrome CRT. The black matte coating is aquadag.

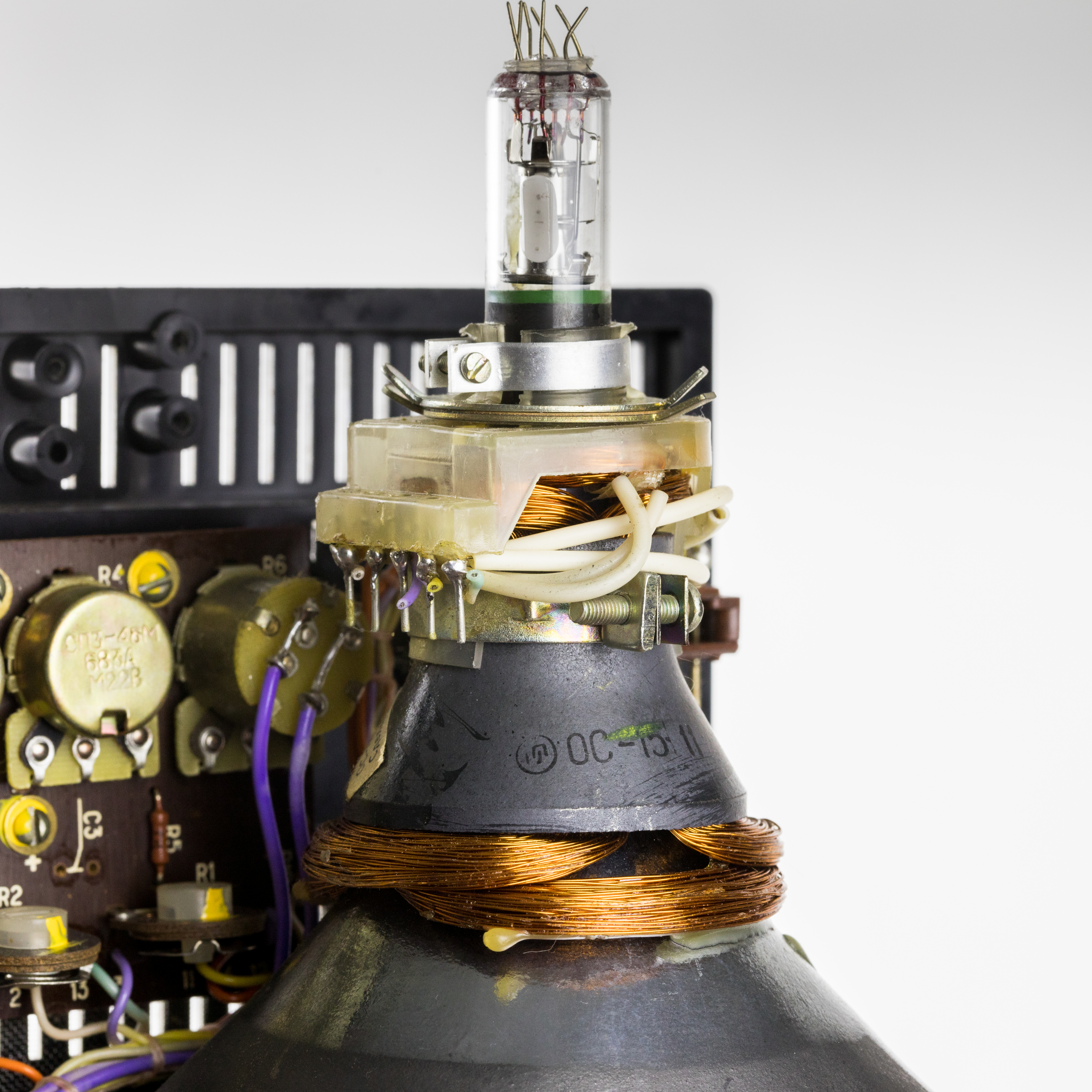
The deflection yoke over the neck of a monochrome CRT. It has two pairs of deflection coils.

If the CRT is in black and white (B&W or monochrome), there is a single electron gun in the neck and the funnel is coated on the inside with aluminum that has been applied by evaporation; the aluminum is evaporated in a vacuum and allowed to condense on the inside of the CRT. This was often done by placing the CRT in a special machine to draw a vacuum within the CRT, evaporate the aluminum inside the CRT using a heater surrounding a piece of aluminum, and then release the vacuum. Aluminum eliminates the need for ion traps, necessary to prevent ion burn on the phosphor, while also reflecting light generated by the phosphor towards the screen, managing heat and absorbing electrons providing a return path for them; previously funnels were coated on the inside with aquadag, used because it can be applied like paint; the phosphors were left uncoated. Aluminum started being applied to CRTs in the 1950s, coating the inside of the CRT including the phosphors, which also increased image brightness since the aluminum reflected light (that would otherwise be lost inside the CRT) towards the outside of the CRT. In aluminized monochrome CRTs, Aquadag is used on the outside. There is a single aluminum coating covering the funnel and the screen.

The screen, funnel and neck are fused together into a single envelope, possibly using lead enamel seals, a hole is made in the funnel onto which the anode cap is installed and the phosphor, aquadag and aluminum are applied afterwards. Previously monochrome CRTs used ion traps that required magnets; the magnet was used to deflect the electrons away from the more difficult to deflect ions, letting the electrons through while letting the ions collide into a sheet of metal inside the electron gun. Ion burn results in premature wear of the phosphor. Since ions are harder to deflect than electrons, ion burn leaves a black dot in the center of the screen.

The interior aquadag or aluminum coating was the anode and served to accelerate the electrons towards the screen, collect them after hitting the screen while serving as a capacitor together with the outer aquadag coating. The screen has a single uniform phosphor coating and no shadow mask, technically having no resolution limit.

Monochrome CRTs may use ring magnets to adjust the centering of the electron beam and magnets around the deflection yoke to adjust the geometry of the image.

When a monochrome CRT is shut off, the screen itself retracts to a small, white dot in the center, along with the phosphors shutting down, shot by the electron gun; it sometimes takes a while for it to go away.

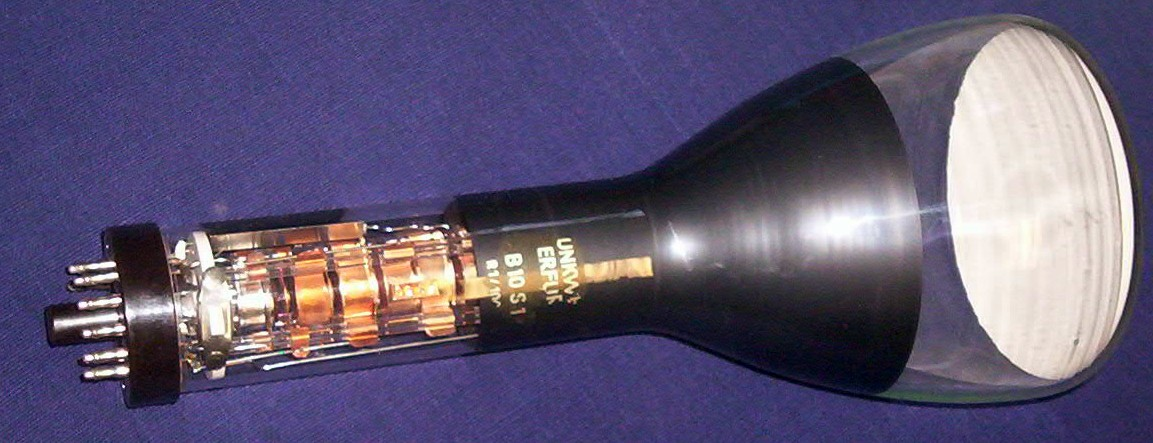
Older monochrome CRT without aluminum, only aquadag

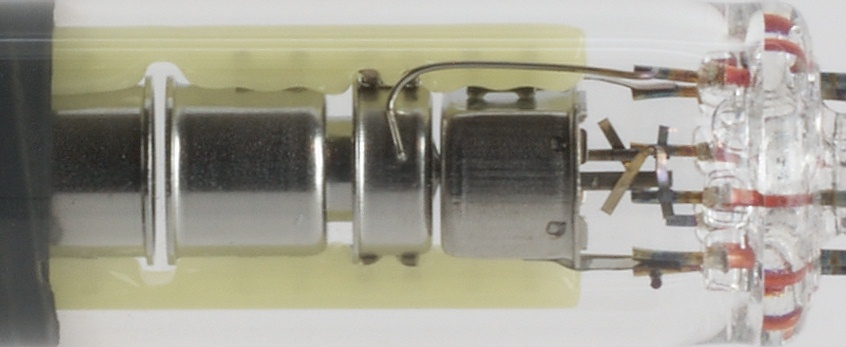
The electron gun of a monochrome CRT

=== Color CRTs ===
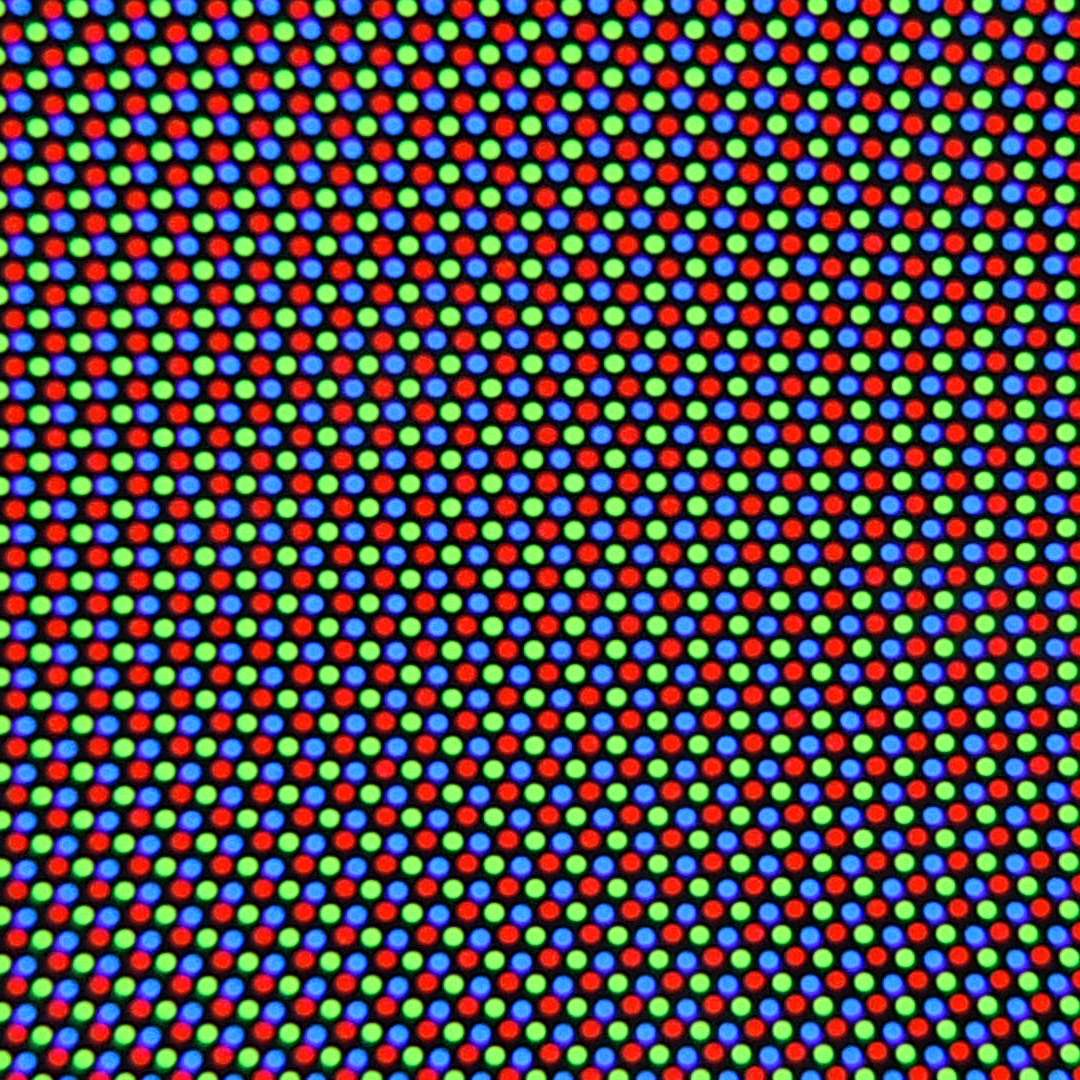
Magnified view of a delta-gun shadow mask color CRT

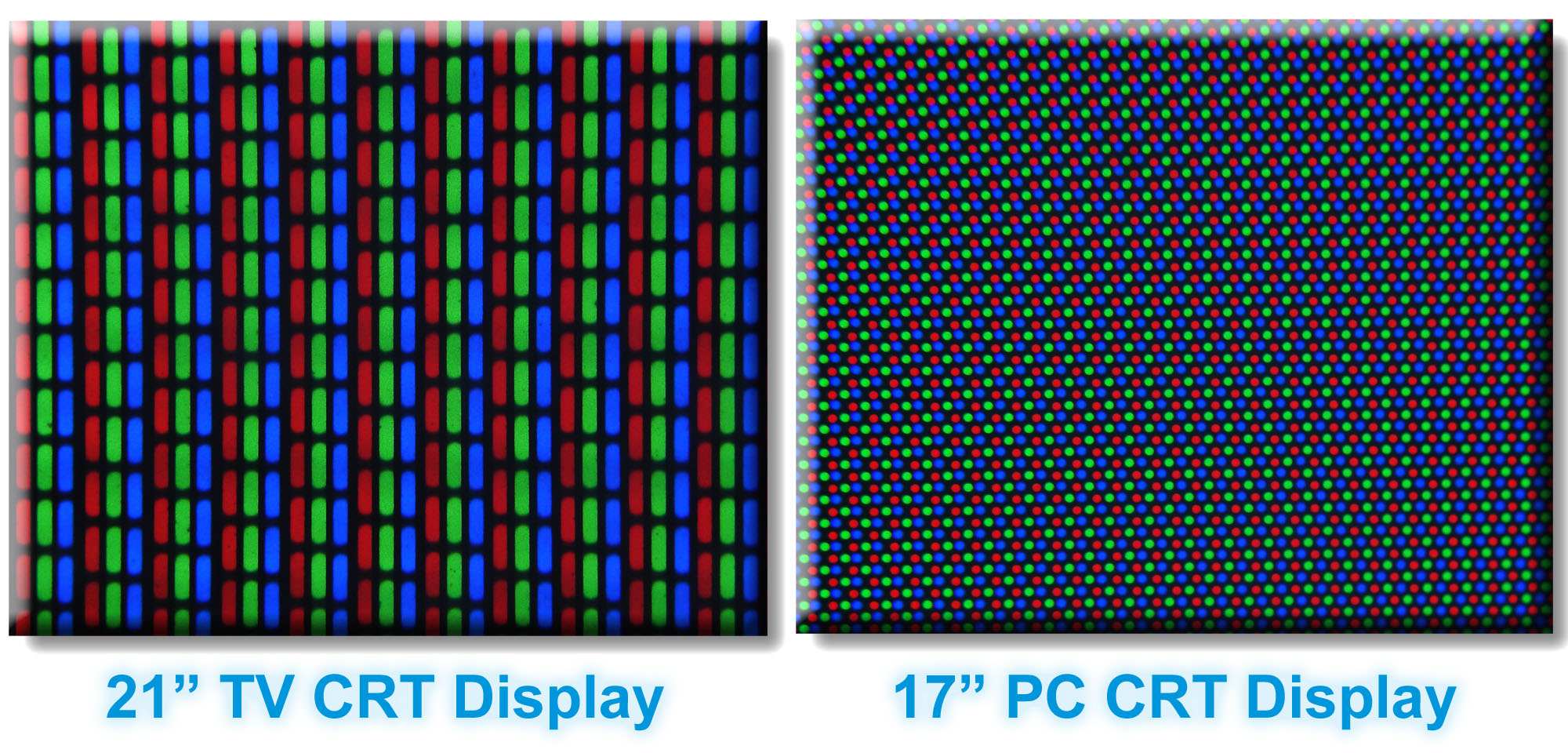
On the left: Magnified view of In-line phosphor triads (a slot mask) CRT. On the right: Magnified view of Delta-gun phosphor triads.

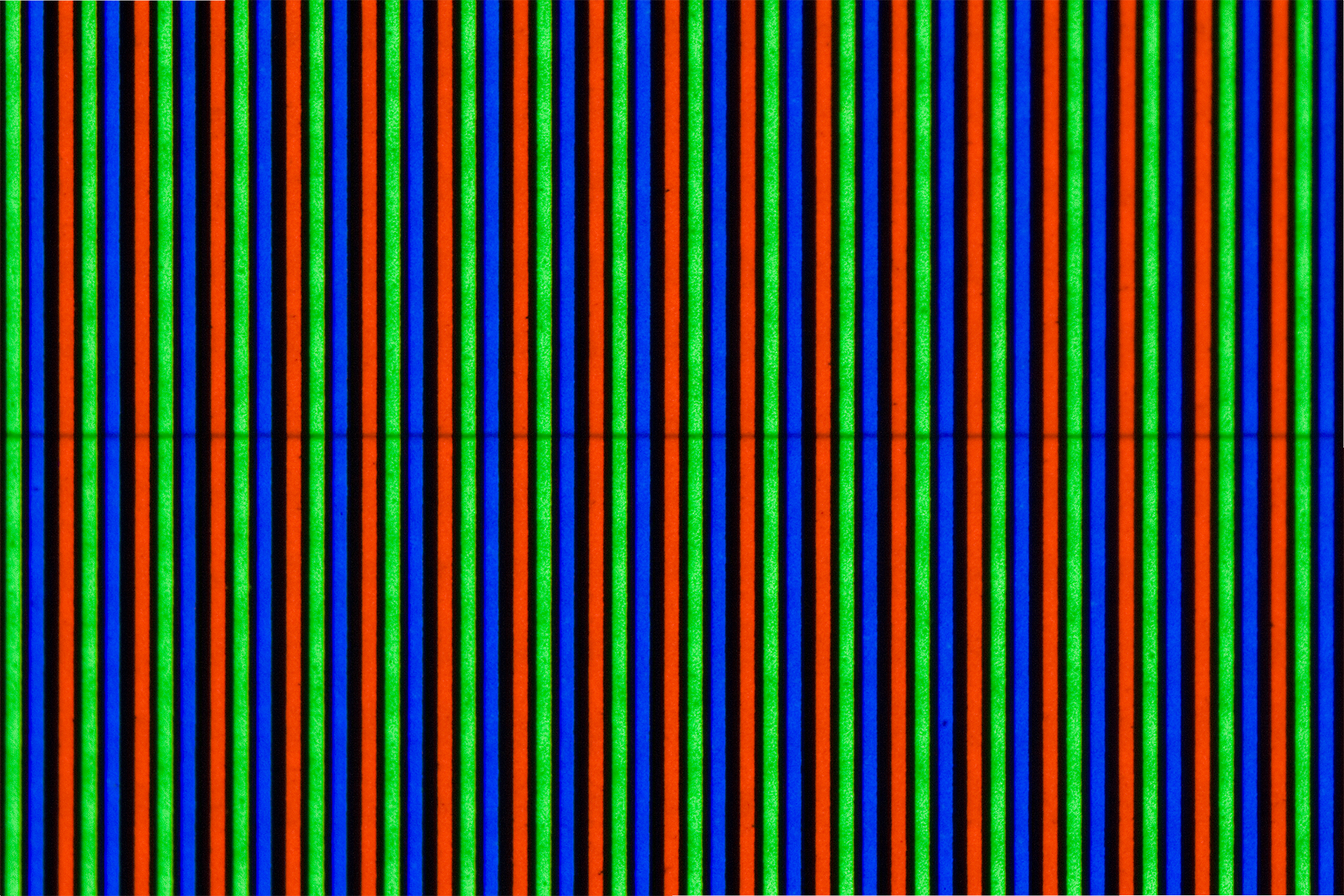
Magnified view of a Trinitron (aperture grille) color CRT. A thin horizontal support wire is visible.

CRT triad and mask types

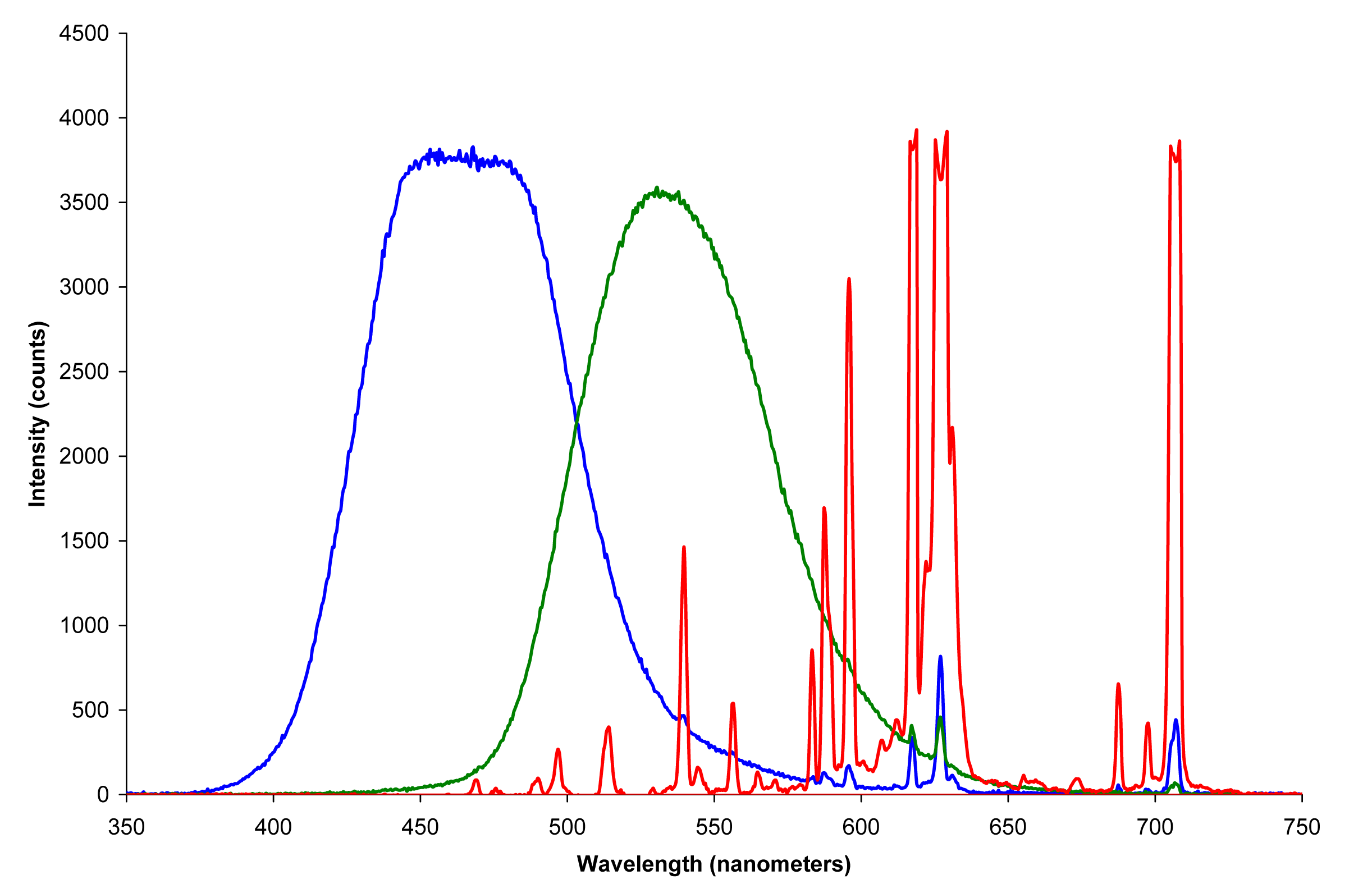
Spectra of constituent blue, green and red phosphors in a common CRT

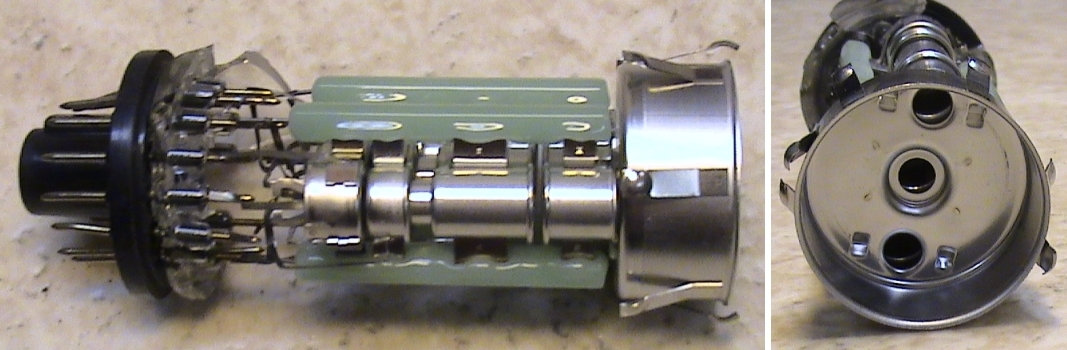
The in-line electron guns of a color CRT TV

Color CRTs use three different phosphors which emit red, green, and blue light respectively. They are packed together in stripes (as in aperture grille designs) or clusters called "triads" (as in shadow mask CRTs).

Color CRTs have three electron guns, one for each primary color, (red, green and blue) arranged either in a straight line (in-line) or in an equilateral triangular configuration (the guns are usually constructed as a single unit). The triangular configuration is often called delta-gun, based on its relation to the shape of the Greek letter delta (Δ). The arrangement of the phosphors is the same as that of the electron guns. A grille or mask absorbs the electrons that would otherwise hit the wrong phosphor.

A shadow mask tube uses a metal plate with tiny holes, typically in a delta configuration, placed so that the electron beam only illuminates the correct phosphors on the face of the tube; blocking all other electrons. Shadow masks that use slots instead of holes are known as slot masks. The holes or slots are tapered so that the electrons that strike the inside of any hole will be reflected back, if they are not absorbed (e.g. due to local charge accumulation), instead of bouncing through the hole to strike a random (wrong) spot on the screen. Another type of color CRT (Trinitron) uses an aperture grille of tensioned vertical wires to achieve the same result. The shadow mask has a single hole for each triad. The shadow mask is usually 1/2 inch behind the screen.

Trinitron CRTs were different from other color CRTs in that they had a single electron gun with three cathodes, an aperture grille which lets more electrons through, increasing image brightness (since the aperture grille does not block as many electrons), and a vertically cylindrical screen, rather than a curved screen.

The three electron guns are in the neck (except for Trinitrons) and the red, green and blue phosphors on the screen may be separated by a black grid or matrix (called black stripe by Toshiba).

The funnel is coated with aquadag on both sides while the screen has a separate aluminum coating applied in a vacuum, deposited after the phosphor coating is applied, facing the electron gun. The aluminum coating protects the phosphor from ions, absorbs secondary electrons, providing them with a return path, preventing them from electrostatically charging the screen which would then repel electrons and reduce image brightness, reflects the light from the phosphors forwards and helps manage heat. It also serves as the anode of the CRT together with the inner aquadag coating. The inner coating is electrically connected to an electrode of the electron gun using springs, forming the final anode. The outer aquadag coating is connected to ground, possibly using a series of springs or a harness that makes contact with the aquadag.

==== Shadow mask ====
The shadow mask absorbs or reflects electrons that would otherwise strike the wrong phosphor dots, causing color purity issues (discoloration of images); in other words, when set up correctly, the shadow mask helps ensure color purity. When the electrons strike the shadow mask, they release their energy as heat and x-rays. If the electrons have too much energy due to an anode voltage that is too high for example, the shadow mask can warp due to the heat, which can also happen during the Lehr baking at ~435 °C of the frit seal between the faceplate and the funnel of the CRT.

Shadow masks were replaced in TVs by slot masks in the 1970s, since slot masks let more electrons through, increasing image brightness. Shadow masks may be connected electrically to the anode of the CRT. Trinitron used a single electron gun with three cathodes instead of three complete guns. CRT PC monitors usually use shadow masks, except for Sony's Trinitron, Mitsubishi's Diamondtron and NEC's Cromaclear; Trinitron and Diamondtron use aperture grilles while Cromaclear uses a slot mask. Some shadow mask CRTs have color phosphors that are smaller in diameter than the electron beams used to light them, with the intention being to cover the entire phosphor, increasing image brightness. Shadow masks may be pressed into a curved shape.

==== Screen manufacture ====
Early color CRTs did not have a black matrix, which was introduced by Zenith in 1969, and Panasonic in 1970. The black matrix eliminates light leaking from one phosphor to another since the black matrix isolates the phosphor dots from one another, so part of the electron beam touches the black matrix. This is also made necessary by warping of the shadow mask. Light bleeding may still occur due to stray electrons striking the wrong phosphor dots. At high resolutions and refresh rates, phosphors only receive a very small amount of energy, limiting image brightness.

Several methods were used to create the black matrix. One method coated the screen in photoresist such as dichromate-sensitized polyvinyl alcohol (PVA) photoresist which was then dried and exposed; the unexposed areas were removed and the entire screen was coated in colloidal graphite to create a carbon film, and then hydrogen peroxide was used to remove the remaining photoresist alongside the carbon that was on top of it, creating holes that in turn created the black matrix. The photoresist had to be of the correct thickness to ensure sufficient adhesion to the screen, while the exposure step had to be controlled to avoid holes that were too small or large with ragged edges caused by light diffraction, ultimately limiting the maximum resolution of large color CRTs. The holes were then filled with phosphor using the method described above. Another method used phosphors suspended in an aromatic diazonium salt that adhered to the screen when exposed to light; the phosphors were applied, then exposed to cause them to adhere to the screen, repeating the process once for each color. Then carbon was applied to the remaining areas of the screen while exposing the entire screen to light to create the black matrix, and a fixing process using an aqueous polymer solution was applied to the screen to make the phosphors and black matrix resistant to water. Black chromium may be used instead of carbon in the black matrix. Other methods were also used.

The phosphors are applied using photolithography. The inner side of the screen is coated with phosphor particles suspended in PVA photoresist slurry, which is then dried using infrared light, exposed, and developed. The exposure is done using a "lighthouse" that uses an ultraviolet light source with a corrector lens to allow the CRT to achieve color purity. Removable shadow masks with spring-loaded clips are used as photomasks. The process is repeated with all colors. Usually the green phosphor is the first to be applied. After phosphor application, the screen is baked to eliminate any organic chemicals (such as the PVA that was used to deposit the phosphor) that may remain on the screen. Alternatively, the phosphors may be applied in a vacuum chamber by evaporating them and allowing them to condense on the screen, creating a very uniform coating. Early color CRTs had their phosphors deposited using silkscreen printing. Phosphors may have color filters over them (facing the viewer), contain pigment of the color emitted by the phosphor, or be encapsulated in color filters to improve color purity and reproduction while reducing glare. Such technology was sold by Toshiba under the Microfilter brand name. Poor exposure due to insufficient light leads to poor phosphor adhesion to the screen, which limits the maximum resolution of a CRT, as the smaller phosphor dots required for higher resolutions cannot receive as much light due to their smaller size. Then the screen is coated with aluminum over the phosphor layer by placing the screen in a machine, that creates a vacuum on the side of the screen facing the electron gun, and evaporating aluminum, which condenses on the screen.

After the screen is coated with phosphor and aluminum, the shadow mask installed onto it by using heat to fuse metal pegs onto the screen. Then the screen is bonded to the funnel using a glass frit that may contain 65–88% of lead oxide by weight. The lead oxide is necessary for the glass frit to have a low melting temperature. Boron oxide (III) may also present to stabilize the frit, with alumina powder as filler powder to control the thermal expansion of the frit. The frit may be applied as a paste consisting of frit particles suspended in amyl acetate or in a polymer with an alkyl methacrylate monomer together with an organic solvent to dissolve the polymer and monomer. The CRT is then baked in an oven in what is called a Lehr bake, to cure the frit, sealing the funnel and screen together. The frit contains a large quantity of lead, causing color CRTs to contain more lead than their monochrome counterparts. Monochrome CRTs on the other hand do not require frit; the funnel can be fused directly to the glass by melting and joining the edges of the funnel and screen using gas flames. Frit is used in color CRTs to prevent deformation of the shadow mask and screen during the fusing process. The edges of the screen and the edges of funnel of the CRT that mate with the screen, are never melted. A primer may be applied on the edges of the funnel and screen before the frit paste is applied to improve adhesion. The Lehr bake consists of several successive steps that heat and then cool the CRT gradually until it reaches a temperature of 435–475 °C (other sources may state different temperatures, such as 440 °C) After the Lehr bake, the CRT is flushed with air or nitrogen to remove contaminants, the electron gun is inserted and sealed into the neck of the CRT, and a vacuum is formed on the CRT.

==== Convergence and purity in color CRTs ====
Due to limitations in the dimensional precision with which CRTs can be manufactured economically, it has not been practically possible to build color CRTs in which three electron beams could be aligned to hit phosphors of respective color in acceptable coordination, solely on the basis of the geometric configuration of the electron gun axes and gun aperture positions, shadow mask apertures, etc. The shadow mask ensures that one beam will only hit spots of certain colors of phosphors, but minute variations in physical alignment of the internal parts among individual CRTs will cause variations in the exact alignment of the beams through the shadow mask, allowing some electrons from, for example, the red beam to hit, say, blue phosphors, unless some individual compensation is made for the variance among individual tubes.

Color convergence and color purity are two aspects of this single problem. Firstly, for correct color rendering it is necessary that regardless of where the beams are deflected on the screen, all three hit the same spot (and nominally pass through the same hole or slot) on the shadow mask. This is called convergence. More specifically, the convergence at the center of the screen (with no deflection field applied by the yoke) is called static convergence, and the convergence over the rest of the screen area (specially at the edges and corners) is called dynamic convergence. The beams may converge at the center of the screen and yet stray from each other as they are deflected toward the edges; such a CRT would be said to have good static convergence but poor dynamic convergence. Secondly, each beam must only strike the phosphors of the color it is intended to strike and no others. This is called purity. Like convergence, there is static purity and dynamic purity, with the same meanings of "static" and "dynamic" as for convergence. Convergence and purity are distinct parameters; a CRT could have good purity but poor convergence, or vice versa. Poor convergence causes color "shadows" or "ghosts" along displayed edges and contours, as if the image on the screen were intaglio printed with poor registration. Poor purity causes objects on the screen to appear off-color while their edges remain sharp. Purity and convergence problems can occur at the same time, in the same or different areas of the screen or both over the whole screen, and either uniformly or to greater or lesser degrees over different parts of the screen.

A magnet used on a CRT TV. Note the distortion of the image.

The solution to the static convergence and purity problems is a set of color alignment ring magnets installed around the neck of the CRT. These movable weak permanent magnets are usually mounted on the back end of the deflection yoke assembly and are set at the factory to compensate for any static purity and convergence errors that are intrinsic to the unadjusted tube. Typically there are two or three pairs of two magnets in the form of rings made of plastic impregnated with a magnetic material, with their magnetic fields parallel to the planes of the magnets, which are perpendicular to the electron gun axes. Often, one pair of rings has 2 poles, another has 4, and the remaining ring has 6 poles. Each pair of magnetic rings forms a single effective magnet whose field vector can be fully and freely adjusted (in both direction and magnitude). By rotating a pair of magnets relative to each other, their relative field alignment can be varied, adjusting the effective field strength of the pair. (As they rotate relative to each other, each magnet's field can be considered to have two opposing components at right angles, and these four components [two each for two magnets] form two pairs, one pair reinforcing each other and the other pair opposing and canceling each other. Rotating away from alignment, the magnets' mutually reinforcing field components decrease as they are traded for increasing opposed, mutually cancelling components.) By rotating a pair of magnets together, preserving the relative angle between them, the direction of their collective magnetic field can be varied. Overall, adjusting all of the convergence/purity magnets allows a finely tuned slight electron beam deflection or lateral offset to be applied, which compensates for minor static convergence and purity errors intrinsic to the uncalibrated tube. Once set, these magnets are usually glued in place, but normally they can be freed and readjusted in the field (e.g. by a TV repair shop) if necessary. On some CRTs, additional fixed adjustable magnets are added for dynamic convergence or dynamic purity at specific points on the screen, typically near the corners or edges. Further adjustment of dynamic convergence and purity typically cannot be done passively, but requires active compensation circuits, one to correct convergence horizontally and another to correct it vertically. In this case the deflection yoke contains convergence coils, a set of two per color, wound on the same core, to which the convergence signals are applied. That means 6 convergence coils in groups of 3, with 2 coils per group, with one coil for horizontal convergence correction and another for vertical convergence correction, with each group sharing a ferrite core. The groups are separated 120° from one another. Dynamic convergence is necessary because the front of the CRT and the shadow mask are not spherical, compensating for electron beam defocusing and astigmatism. The fact that the CRT screen is not spherical leads to geometry problems which may be corrected using a circuit. The signals used for convergence are parabolic waveforms derived from three signals coming from a vertical output circuit. The parabolic signal is fed into the convergence coils, while the other two are sawtooth signals that, when mixed with the parabolic signals, create the necessary signal for convergence. A resistor and diode are used to lock the convergence signal to the center of the screen to prevent it from being affected by the static convergence. The horizontal and vertical convergence circuits are similar. Each circuit has two resonators, one usually tuned to 15,625 Hz and the other to 31,250 Hz, which set the frequency of the signal sent to the convergence coils. Dynamic convergence may be accomplished using electrostatic quadrupole fields in the electron gun. Dynamic convergence means that the electron beam does not travel in a perfectly straight line between the deflection coils and the screen, since the convergence coils cause it to become curved to conform to the screen.

The convergence signal may instead be a sawtooth signal with a slight sine wave appearance, the sine wave part is created using a capacitor in series with each deflection coil. In this case, the convergence signal is used to drive the deflection coils. The sine wave part of the signal causes the electron beam to move more slowly near the edges of the screen. The capacitors used to create the convergence signal are known as the s-capacitors. This type of convergence is necessary due to the high deflection angles and flat screens of many CRT computer monitors. The value of the s-capacitors must be chosen based on the scan rate of the CRT, so multi-syncing monitors must have different sets of s-capacitors, one for each refresh rate.

Dynamic convergence may instead be accomplished in some CRTs using only the ring magnets, magnets glued to the CRT, and by varying the position of the deflection yoke, whose position may be maintained using set screws, a clamp and rubber wedges. 90° deflection angle CRTs may use "self-convergence" without dynamic convergence, which together with the in-line triad arrangement, eliminates the need for separate convergence coils and related circuitry, reducing costs. complexity and CRT depth by 10 millimeters. Self-convergence works by means of "nonuniform" magnetic fields. Dynamic convergence is necessary in 110° deflection angle CRTs, and quadrupole windings on the deflection yoke at a certain frequency may also be used for dynamic convergence.

Dynamic color convergence and purity are one of the main reasons why until late in their history, CRTs were long-necked (deep) and had biaxially curved faces; these geometric design characteristics are necessary for intrinsic passive dynamic color convergence and purity. Only starting around the 1990s did sophisticated active dynamic convergence compensation circuits become available that made short-necked and flat-faced CRTs workable. These active compensation circuits use the deflection yoke to finely adjust beam deflection according to the beam target location. The same techniques (and major circuit components) also make possible the adjustment of display image rotation, skew, and other complex raster geometry parameters through electronics under user control.

Alternatively, the guns can be aligned with one another (converged) using convergence rings placed right outside the neck; with one ring per gun. The rings can have north and south poles. There can be 4 sets of rings, one to adjust RGB convergence, a second to adjust Red and Blue convergence, a third to adjust vertical raster shift, and a fourth to adjust purity. The vertical raster shift adjusts the straightness of the scan line. CRTs may also employ dynamic convergence circuits, which ensure correct convergence at the edges of the CRT. Permalloy magnets may also be used to correct the convergence at the edges. Convergence is carried out with the help of a crosshatch (grid) pattern. Other CRTs may instead use magnets that are pushed in and out instead of rings. In early color CRTs, the holes in the shadow mask became progressively smaller as they extended outwards from the center of the screen, to aid in convergence.

==== Magnetic shielding and degaussing ====
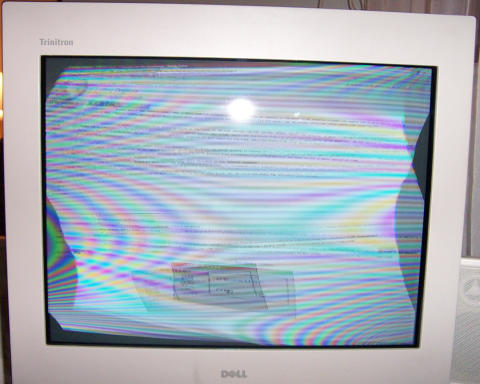
A degaussing in progress

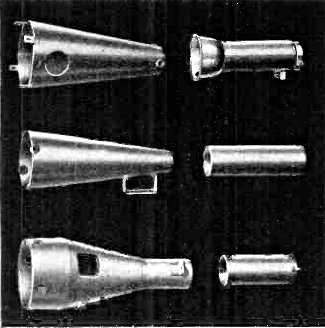
Mu metal magnetic shields for oscilloscope CRTs

If the shadow mask or aperture grille becomes magnetized, its magnetic field alters the paths of the electron beams. This causes errors of "color purity" as the electrons no longer follow only their intended paths, and some will hit some phosphors of colors other than the one intended. For example, some electrons from the red beam may hit blue or green phosphors, imposing a magenta or yellow tint to parts of the image that are supposed to be pure red. (This effect is localized to a specific area of the screen if the magnetization is localized.) Therefore, it is important that the shadow mask or aperture grille not be magnetized. The earth's magnetic field may have an effect on the color purity of the CRT. Because of this, some CRTs have external magnetic shields over their funnels. The magnetic shield may be made of soft iron or mild steel and contain a degaussing coil. The magnetic shield and shadow mask may be permanently magnetized by the earth's magnetic field, adversely affecting color purity when the CRT is moved. This problem is solved with a built-in degaussing coil, found in many TVs and computer monitors. Degaussing may be automatic, occurring whenever the CRT is turned on. The magnetic shield may also be internal, being on the inside of the funnel of the CRT.

Color CRT displays in TV sets and computer monitors often have a built-in degaussing (demagnetizing) coil mounted around the perimeter of the CRT face. Upon power-up of the CRT display, the degaussing circuit produces a brief, alternating current through the coil which fades to zero over a few seconds, producing a decaying alternating magnetic field from the coil. This degaussing field is strong enough to remove shadow mask magnetization in most cases, maintaining color purity. In unusual cases of strong magnetization where the internal degaussing field is not sufficient, the shadow mask may be degaussed externally with a stronger portable degausser or demagnetizer. However, an excessively strong magnetic field, whether alternating or constant, may mechanically deform (bend) the shadow mask, causing a permanent color distortion on the display which looks very similar to a magnetization effect.

==== Resolution ====
Dot pitch defines the maximum resolution of the display, assuming delta-gun CRTs. In these, as the scanned resolution approaches the dot pitch resolution, moiré appears, as the detail being displayed is finer than what the shadow mask can render. Aperture grille monitors do not suffer from vertical moiré, however, because their phosphor stripes have no vertical detail. In smaller CRTs, these strips maintain position by themselves, but larger aperture-grille CRTs require one or two crosswise (horizontal) support strips; one for smaller CRTs, and two for larger ones. The support wires block electrons, causing the wires to be visible. In aperture grille CRTs, dot pitch is replaced by stripe pitch. Hitachi developed the Enhanced Dot Pitch (EDP) shadow mask, which uses oval holes instead of circular ones, with respective oval phosphor dots. Moiré is reduced in shadow mask CRTs by arranging the holes in the shadow mask in a honeycomb-like pattern.

=== Projection CRTs ===
Projection CRTs were used in CRT projectors and CRT rear-projection TVs, and are usually small (being 7–9 inches across); have a phosphor that generates either red, green or blue light, thus making them monochrome CRTs; and are similar in construction to other monochrome CRTs. Larger projection CRTs in general lasted longer, and were able to provide higher brightness levels and resolution, but were also more expensive. Projection CRTs have an unusually high anode voltage for their size (such as 27 or 25 kV for a 5 or 7-inch projection CRT respectively), and a specially made tungsten/barium cathode (instead of the pure barium oxide normally used) that consists of barium atoms embedded in 20% porous tungsten or barium and calcium aluminates or of barium, calcium and aluminum oxides coated on porous tungsten; the barium diffuses through the tungsten to emit electrons. The special cathode can deliver 2 mA of current instead of the 0.3mA of normal cathodes, which makes them bright enough to be used as light sources for projection. The high anode voltage and the specially made cathode increase the voltage and current, respectively, of the electron beam, which increases the light emitted by the phosphors, and also the amount of heat generated during operation; this means that projector CRTs need cooling. The screen is usually cooled using a container (the screen forms part of the container) with glycol; the glycol may itself be dyed, or colorless glycol may be used inside a container which may be colored (forming a lens known as a c-element). Colored lenses or glycol are used for improving color reproduction at the cost of brightness, and are only used on red and green CRTs. Each CRT has its own glycol, which has access to an air bubble to allow the glycol to shrink and expand as it cools and warms. Projector CRTs may have adjustment rings just like color CRTs to adjust astigmatism, which is flaring of the electron beam (stray light similar to shadows). They have three adjustment rings; one with two poles, one with four poles, and another with 6 poles. When correctly adjusted, the projector can display perfectly round dots without flaring. The screens used in projection CRTs were more transparent than usual, with 90% transmittance. The first projection CRTs were made in 1933.

Projector CRTs were available with electrostatic and electromagnetic focusing, the latter being more expensive. Electrostatic focusing used electronics to focus the electron beam, together with focusing magnets around the neck of the CRT for fine focusing adjustments. This type of focusing degraded over time. Electromagnetic focusing was introduced in the early 1990s and included an electromagnetic focusing coil in addition to the already existing focusing magnets. Electromagnetic focusing was much more stable over the lifetime of the CRT, retaining 95% of its sharpness by the end of life of the CRT.

=== Beam-index tube ===
Beam-index tubes, also known as Uniray, Apple CRT or Indextron, was an attempt in the 1950s by Philco to create a color CRT without a shadow mask, eliminating convergence and purity problems, and allowing for shallower CRTs with higher deflection angles. It also required a lower voltage power supply for the final anode since it did not use a shadow mask, which normally blocks around 80% of the electrons generated by the electron gun. The lack of a shadow mask also made it immune to the earth's magnetic field while also making degaussing unnecessary and increasing image brightness. It was constructed similarly to a monochrome CRT, with an aquadag outer coating, an aluminum inner coating, and a single electron gun but with a screen with an alternating pattern of red, green, blue and UV (index) phosphor stripes (similarly to a Trinitron) with a side mounted photomultiplier tube or photodiode pointed towards the rear of the screen and mounted on the funnel of CRT, to track the electron beam to activate the phosphors separately from one another using the same electron beam. Only the index phosphor stripe was used for tracking, and it was the only phosphor that was not covered by an aluminum layer. It was shelved because of the precision required to produce it. It was revived by Sony in the 1980s as the Indextron but its adoption was limited, at least in part due to the development of LCD displays. Beam-index CRTs also suffered from poor contrast ratios of only around 50:1 since some light emission by the phosphors was required at all times by the photodiodes to track the electron beam. It allowed for single CRT color CRT projectors due to a lack of shadow mask; normally CRT projectors use three CRTs, one for each color, since a lot of heat is generated due to the high anode voltage and beam current, making a shadow mask impractical and inefficient since it would warp under the heat produced (shadow masks absorb most of the electron beam, and, hence, most of the energy carried by the relativistic electrons); the three CRTs meant that an involved calibration and adjustment procedure had to be carried out during installation of the projector, and moving the projector would require it to be recalibrated. A single CRT meant the need for calibration was eliminated, but brightness was decreased since the CRT screen had to be used for three colors instead of each color having its own CRT screen. A stripe pattern also imposes a horizontal resolution limit; in contrast, three-screen CRT projectors have no theoretical resolution limit, due to them having single, uniform phosphor coatings.

=== Flat CRTs ===
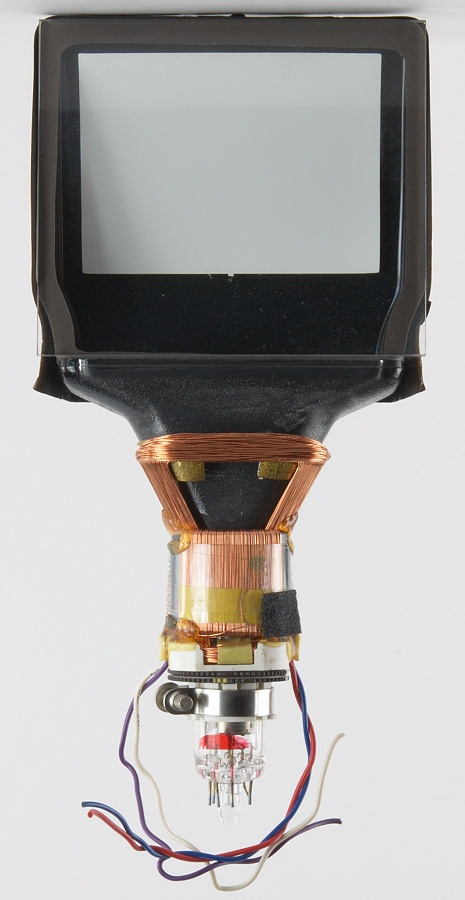
The front of a Sony Watchman monochrome CRT

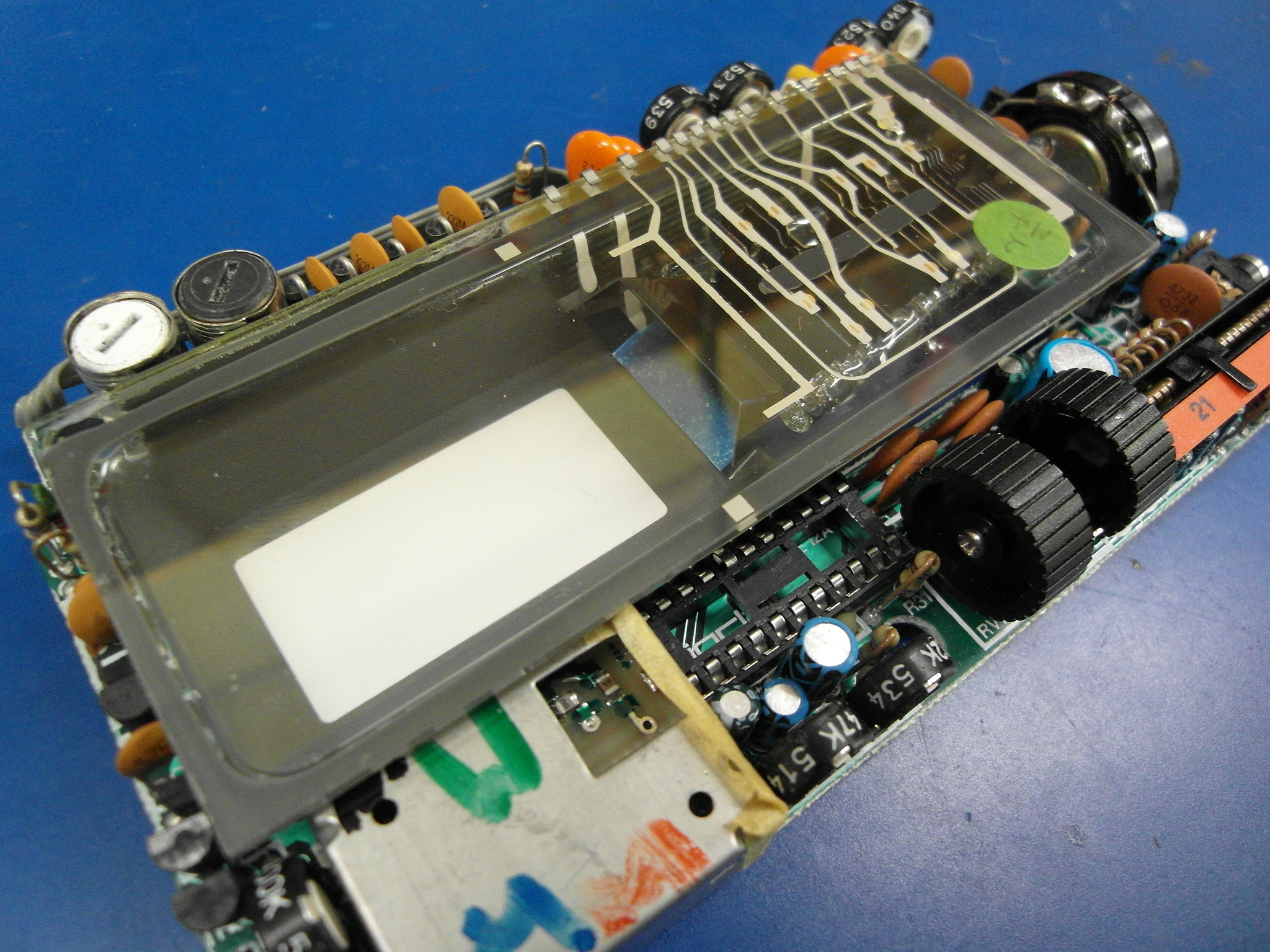
A flat monochrome CRT assembly inside a 1984 Sinclair TV80 portable TV

Flat CRTs are those with a flat screen. Despite having a flat screen, they may not be completely flat, especially on the inside, instead having a greatly increased curvature. A notable exception is the LG Flatron (made by LG.Philips Displays, later LP Displays) which is truly flat on the outside and inside, but has a bonded glass pane on the screen with a tensioned rim band to provide implosion protection. Such completely flat CRTs were first introduced by Zenith in 1986, and used flat tensioned shadow masks, where the shadow mask is held under tension, providing increased resistance to blooming. LG's Flatron technology is based on this technology developed by Zenith, now a subsidiary of LG. Flat CRTs have a number of challenges, like deflection. Vertical deflection boosters are required to increase the amount of current that is sent to the vertical deflection coils to compensate for the reduced curvature. The CRTs used in the Sinclair TV80, and in many Sony Watchmans were flat in that they were not deep and their front screens were flat, but their electron guns were put to a side of the screen. The TV80 used electrostatic deflection while the Watchman used magnetic deflection with a phosphor screen that was curved inwards. Similar CRTs were used in video door bells.

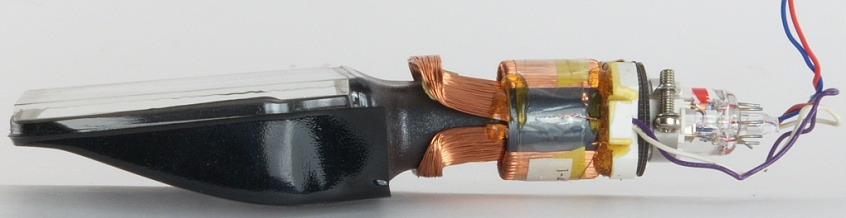
The side of a Sony Watchman monochrome CRT. One of the pairs of deflection coils is easily noticeable

=== Radar CRTs ===
Radar CRTs such as the 7JP4 had a circular screen and scanned the beam from the center outwards. The deflection yoke rotated, causing the beam to rotate in a circular fashion. The screen often had two colors, often a bright short persistence color that only appeared as the beam scanned the display and a long persistence phosphor afterglow. When the beam strikes the phosphor, the phosphor brightly illuminates, and when the beam leaves, the dimmer long persistence afterglow would remain lit where the beam struck the phosphor, alongside the radar targets that were "written" by the beam, until the beam re-struck the phosphor.

=== Oscilloscope CRTs ===
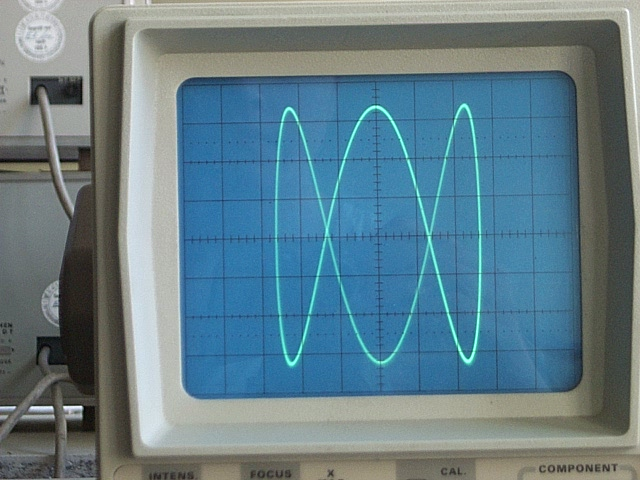
An oscilloscope showing a Lissajous curve

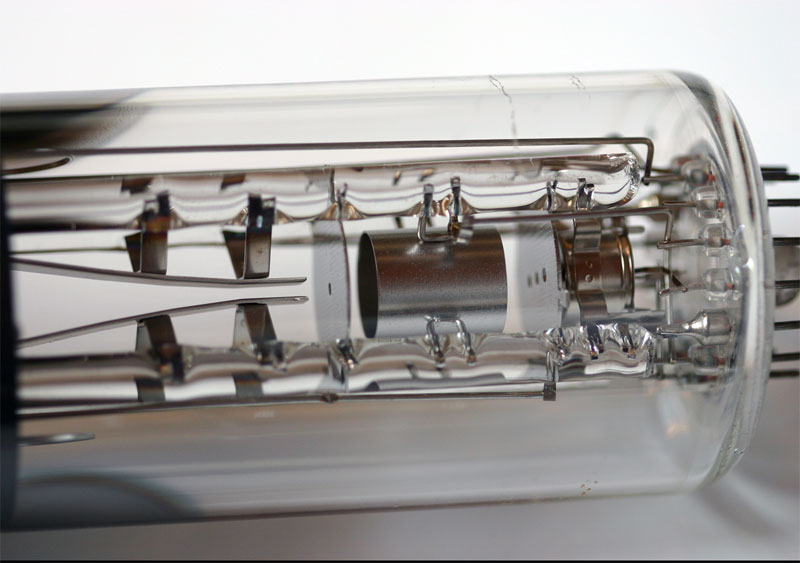
The electron gun of an oscilloscope. A pair of deflection plates is visible on the left.

In oscilloscope CRTs, electrostatic deflection is used, rather than the magnetic deflection commonly used with TV and other large CRTs. The beam is deflected horizontally by applying an electric field between a pair of plates to its left and right, and vertically by applying an electric field to plates above and below. TVs use magnetic rather than electrostatic deflection because the deflection plates obstruct the beam when the deflection angle is as large as is required for tubes that are relatively short for their size. Some Oscilloscope CRTs incorporate post deflection anodes (PDAs) that are spiral-shaped to ensure even anode potential across the CRT and operate at up to 15 kV. In PDA CRTs the electron beam is deflected before it is accelerated, improving sensitivity and legibility, specially when analyzing voltage pulses with short duty cycles.

==== Microchannel plate ====
When displaying fast one-shot events, the electron beam must deflect very quickly, with few electrons impinging on the screen, leading to a faint or invisible image on the display. Oscilloscope CRTs designed for very fast signals can give a brighter display by passing the electron beam through a micro-channel plate just before it reaches the screen. Through the phenomenon of secondary emission, this plate multiplies the number of electrons reaching the phosphor screen, giving a significant improvement in writing rate (brightness) and improved sensitivity and spot size as well.

==== Graticules ====
Most oscilloscopes have a graticule as part of the visual display, to facilitate measurements. The graticule may be permanently marked inside the face of the CRT, or it may be a transparent external plate made of glass or acrylic plastic. An internal graticule eliminates parallax error, but cannot be changed to accommodate different types of measurements. Oscilloscopes commonly provide a means for the graticule to be illuminated from the side, which improves its visibility.

==== Image storage tubes ====
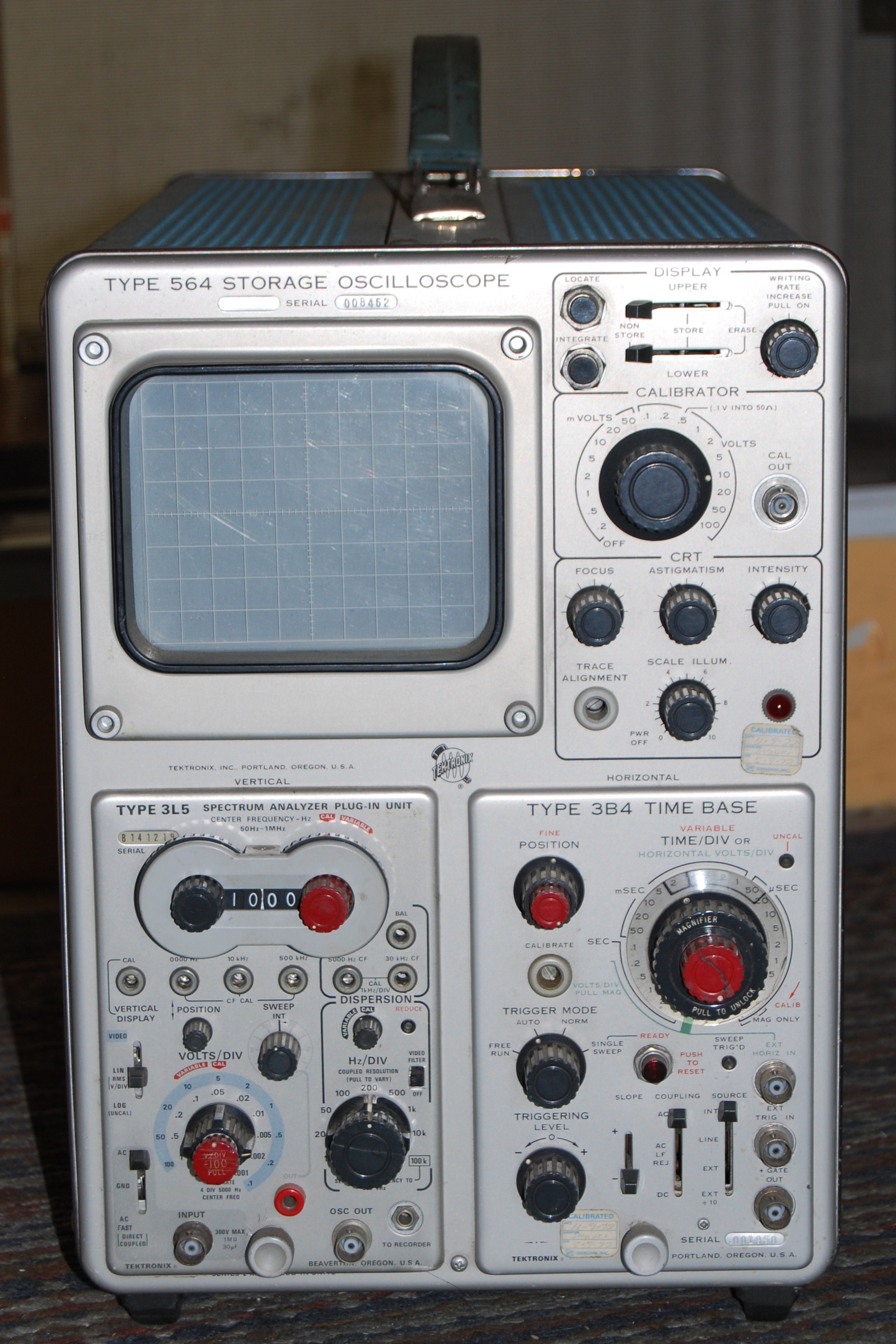
The Tektronix Type 564: first mass-produced analog phosphor storage oscilloscope

These are found in analog phosphor storage oscilloscopes. These are distinct from digital storage oscilloscopes which rely on solid state digital memory to store the image.

Where a single brief event is monitored by an oscilloscope, such an event will be displayed by a conventional tube only while it actually occurs. The use of a long persistence phosphor may allow the image to be observed after the event, but only for a few seconds at best. This limitation can be overcome by the use of a direct view storage cathode ray tube (storage tube). A storage tube will continue to display the event after it has occurred until such time as it is erased. A storage tube is similar to a conventional tube except that it is equipped with a metal grid coated with a dielectric layer located immediately behind the phosphor screen. An externally applied voltage to the mesh initially ensures that the whole mesh is at a constant potential. This mesh is constantly exposed to a low velocity electron beam from a 'flood gun' which operates independently of the main gun. This flood gun is not deflected like the main gun but constantly 'illuminates' the whole of the storage mesh. The initial charge on the storage mesh is such as to repel the electrons from the flood gun which are prevented from striking the phosphor screen.

When the main electron gun writes an image to the screen, the energy in the main beam is sufficient to create a 'potential relief' on the storage mesh. The areas where this relief is created no longer repel the electrons from the flood gun which now pass through the mesh and illuminate the phosphor screen. Consequently, the image that was briefly traced out by the main gun continues to be displayed after it has occurred. The image can be 'erased' by resupplying the external voltage to the mesh restoring its constant potential. The time for which the image can be displayed was limited because, in practice, the flood gun slowly neutralises the charge on the storage mesh. One way of allowing the image to be retained for longer is temporarily to turn off the flood gun. It is then possible for the image to be retained for several days. The majority of storage tubes allow for a lower voltage to be applied to the storage mesh which slowly restores the initial charge state. By varying this voltage a variable persistence is obtained. Turning off the flood gun and the voltage supply to the storage mesh allows such a tube to operate as a conventional oscilloscope tube.

=== Vector monitors ===
Vector monitors were used in early computer aided design systems and are in some late-1970s to mid-1980s arcade games such as Asteroids. They draw graphics point-to-point, rather than scanning a raster. Either monochrome or color CRTs can be used in vector displays, and the essential principles of CRT design and operation are the same for either type of display; the main difference is in the beam deflection patterns and circuits.

=== Data storage tubes ===
The Williams tube or Williams-Kilburn tube was a cathode ray tube used to electronically store binary data. It was used in computers of the 1940s as a random-access digital storage device. In contrast to other CRTs in this article, the Williams tube was not a display device, and in fact could not be viewed since a metal plate covered its screen.

=== Cat's eye ===
In some vacuum tube radio sets, a "Magic Eye" or "Tuning Eye" tube was provided to assist in tuning the receiver. Tuning would be adjusted until the width of a radial shadow was minimized. This was used instead of a more expensive electromechanical meter, which later came to be used on higher-end tuners when transistor sets lacked the high voltage required to drive the device. The same type of device was used with tape recorders as a recording level meter, and for various other applications including electrical test equipment.

=== Charactrons ===
Some displays for early computers (those that needed to display more text than was practical using vectors, or that required high speed for photographic output) used Charactron CRTs. These incorporate a perforated metal character mask (stencil), which shapes a wide electron beam to form a character on the screen. The system selects a character on the mask using one set of deflection circuits, but that causes the extruded beam to be aimed off-axis, so a second set of deflection plates has to re-aim the beam so it is headed toward the center of the screen. A third set of plates places the character wherever required. The beam is unblanked (turned on) briefly to draw the character at that position. Graphics could be drawn by selecting the position on the mask corresponding to the code for a space (in practice, they were simply not drawn), which had a small round hole in the center; this effectively disabled the character mask, and the system reverted to regular vector behavior. Charactrons had exceptionally long necks, because of the need for three deflection systems.

=== Nimo ===
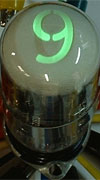
Nimo tube BA0000-P31

Nimo was the trademark of a family of small specialised CRTs manufactured by Industrial Electronic Engineers. These had 10 electron guns which produced electron beams in the form of digits in a manner similar to that of the charactron. The tubes were either simple single-digit displays or more complex 4- or 6- digit displays produced by means of a suitable magnetic deflection system. Having little of the complexities of a standard CRT, the tube required a relatively simple driving circuit, and as the image was projected on the glass face, it provided a much wider viewing angle than competitive types (e.g., nixie tubes). However, their requirement for several voltages and their high voltage made them uncommon.

=== Flood-beam CRT ===
Flood-beam CRTs are small tubes that are arranged as pixels for large video walls like Jumbotrons. The first screen using this technology (called Diamond Vision by Mitsubishi Electric) was introduced by Mitsubishi Electric for the 1980 Major League Baseball All-Star Game. It differs from a normal CRT in that the electron gun within does not produce a focused controllable beam. Instead, electrons are sprayed in a wide cone across the entire front of the phosphor screen, basically making each unit act as a single light bulb. Each one is coated with a red, green or blue phosphor, to make up the color sub-pixels. This technology has largely been replaced with light-emitting diode displays. Unfocused and undeflected CRTs were used as grid-controlled stroboscope lamps since 1958. Electron-stimulated luminescence (ESL) lamps, which use the same operating principle, were released in 2011.

=== Print-head CRT ===
CRTs with an unphosphored front glass but with fine wires embedded in it were used as electrostatic print heads in the 1960s. The wires would pass the electron beam current through the glass onto a sheet of paper where the desired content was therefore deposited as an electrical charge pattern. The paper was then passed near a pool of liquid ink with the opposite charge. The charged areas of the paper attract the ink and thus form the image.

=== Zeus – thin CRT display ===
In the late 1990s and early 2000s Philips Research Laboratories experimented with a type of thin CRT known as the Zeus display, which contained CRT-like functionality in a flat-panel display. The cathode of this display was mounted under the front of the display, and the electrons from the cathode would be directed to the back to the display where they would stay until extracted by electrodes near the front of the display, and directed to the front of the display which had phosphor dots. The devices were demonstrated but never marketed.

=== Slimmer CRT ===
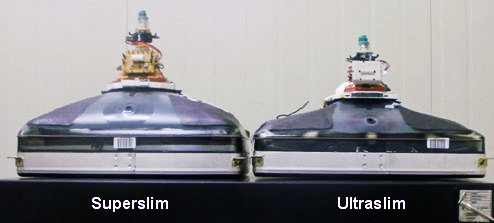
Comparison between a Superslim and Ultraslim CRT

Some CRT manufacturers, both LG.Philips Displays (later LP Displays) and Samsung SDI, innovated CRT technology by creating a slimmer tube. Slimmer CRT had the trade names Superslim, Ultraslim, Vixlim (by Samsung) and Cybertube and Cybertube+ (both by LG Philips displays). A 21-inch (53 cm) flat CRT has a 447.2-millimetre (17.61 in) depth. The depth of Superslim was 352 millimetres (13.86 in) and Ultraslim was 295.7 millimetres (11.64 in).

== Health concerns ==
=== Ionizing radiation ===
CRTs can emit a small amount of X-ray radiation; this is a result of the electron beam's bombardment of the shadow mask/aperture grille and phosphors, which produces bremsstrahlung (braking radiation) as the high-energy electrons are decelerated. The amount of radiation escaping the front of the monitor is widely considered to be not harmful. The United States Food and Drug Administration (FDA) regulations in 21 CFR 1020.10 are used to strictly limit, for instance, TV receivers to 0.5 milliroentgens per hour at a distance of 5 cm (2 in) from any external surface; since 2007, most CRTs have emissions that fall well below this limit. Note that the roentgen is an outdated unit and does not account for dose absorption. The conversion rate is about .877 roentgen per rem. Assuming that the viewer absorbed the entire dose (which is unlikely), and that they watched TV for 2 hours a day, a .5 milliroentgen hourly dose would increase the viewers yearly dose by 320 millirem. For comparison, the average background radiation in the United States is 310 millirem a year. Negative effects of chronic radiation are not generally noticeable until doses over 20,000 millirem.

The density of the X-rays that would be generated by a CRT is low because the raster scan of a typical CRT distributes the energy of the electron beam across the entire screen. Voltages above 15,000 volts are enough to generate "soft" X-rays. However, since CRTs may stay on for several hours at a time, the amount of X-rays generated by a CRT may become significant, hence the importance of using materials to shield against X-rays, such as the thick leaded glass and barium-strontium glass used in CRTs.

Concerns about X-rays emitted by CRTs began in 1967 when it was found that TV sets made by General Electric were emitting "X-radiation in excess of desirable levels". It was later found that TV sets from all manufacturers were also emitting radiation. This caused TV industry representatives to be brought before a U.S. congressional committee, which later proposed a federal radiation regulation bill, which became the 1968 Radiation Control for Health and Safety Act. It was recommended to TV set owners to always be at a distance of at least 6 feet from the screen of the TV set, and to avoid "prolonged exposure" at the sides, rear or underneath a TV set. It was discovered that most of the radiation was directed downwards. Owners were also told to not modify their set's internals to avoid exposure to radiation. Headlines about "radioactive" TV sets continued until the end of the 1960s. There once was a proposal by two New York congressmen that would have forced TV set manufacturers to "go into homes to test all of the nation's 15 million color sets and to install radiation devices in them". The FDA eventually began regulating radiation emissions from all electronic products in the US.

=== Toxicity ===
Older color and monochrome CRTs may have been manufactured with toxic substances, such as cadmium, in the phosphors. The rear glass tube of modern CRTs may be made from leaded glass, which represent an environmental hazard if disposed of improperly. Since 1970, glass in the front panel (the viewable portion of the CRT) used strontium oxide rather than lead, though the rear of the CRT was still produced from leaded glass. Monochrome CRTs typically do not contain enough leaded glass to fail EPA TCLP tests. While the TCLP process grinds the glass into fine particles in order to expose them to weak acids to test for leachate, intact CRT glass does not leach (The lead is vitrified, contained inside the glass itself, similar to leaded glass crystalware).

=== Flicker ===
At low refresh rates (60 Hz and below), the periodic scanning of the display may produce a flicker that some people perceive more easily than others, especially when viewed with peripheral vision. Flicker is commonly associated with CRT as most TVs run at 50 Hz (PAL) or 60 Hz (NTSC), although there are some 100 Hz PAL TVs that are flicker-free. Typically only low-end monitors run at such low frequencies, with most computer monitors supporting at least 75 Hz and high-end monitors capable of 100 Hz or more to eliminate any perception of flicker. Though the 100 Hz PAL was often achieved using interleaved scanning, dividing the circuit and scan into two beams of 50 Hz. Non-computer CRTs or CRT for sonar or radar may have long persistence phosphor and are thus flicker free. If the persistence is too long on a video display, moving images will be blurred.

=== High-frequency audible noise ===
50 Hz/60 Hz CRTs used for TV operate with horizontal scanning frequencies of about 15,000 Hz: 15,750 and 15,734.27 Hz (for NTSC systems) or 15,625 Hz (for PAL systems). These frequencies are at the upper range of human hearing and are inaudible to many people; however, some people (especially children) will perceive a high-pitched tone near an operating CRT TV. The sound is due to magnetostriction in the magnetic core and periodic movement of windings of the flyback transformer but it can also be created by movement of the deflection coils, yoke or ferrite beads.

This problem does not occur on 100/120 Hz TVs and on non-CGA (Color Graphics Adapter) computer displays, because they use much higher horizontal scanning frequencies that produce sound which is inaudible to humans (22 kHz to over 100 kHz).

=== Implosion ===
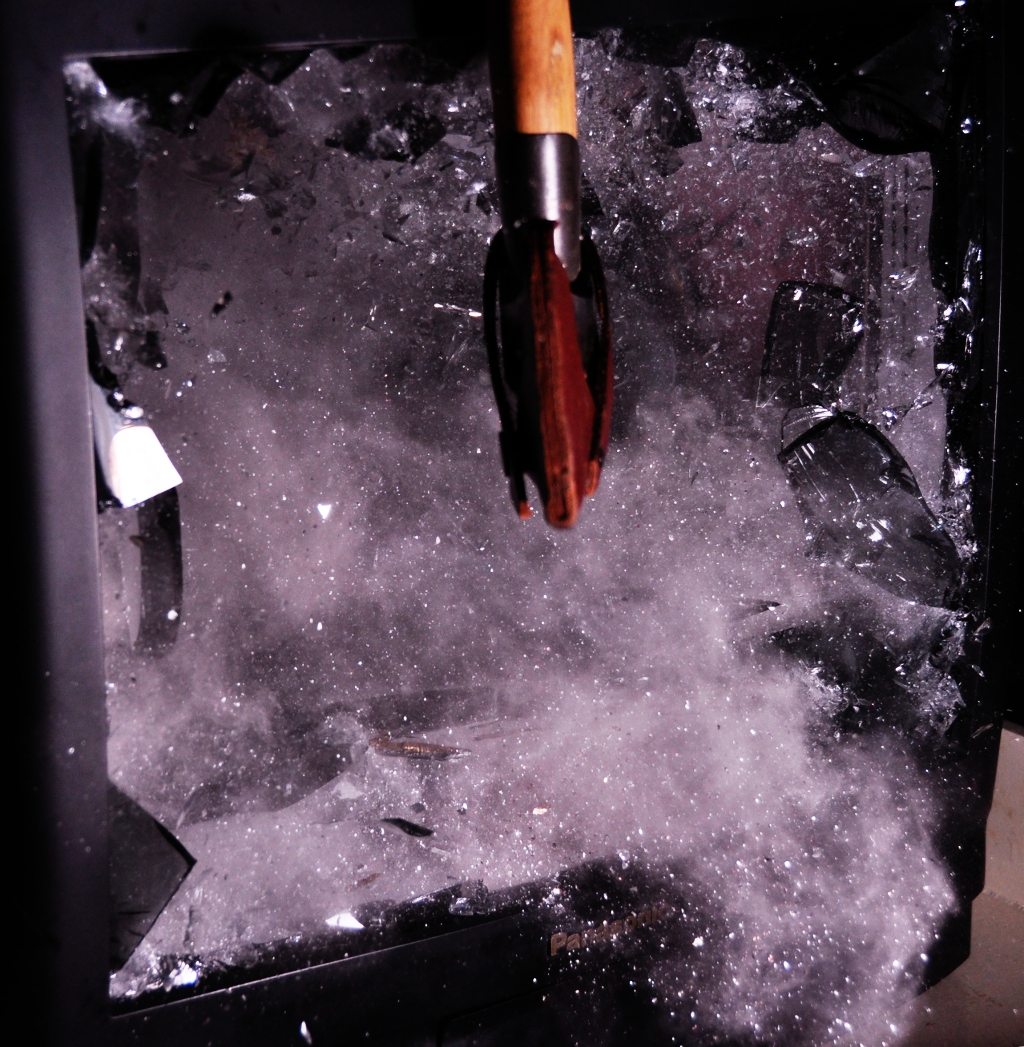
A CRT during an implosion

If the glass wall is damaged, atmospheric pressure can implode the vacuum tube into dangerous fragments that accelerate inward and then spray at high speed in all directions. Although modern cathode ray tubes used in TVs and computer displays have epoxy-bonded face-plates or other measures to prevent shattering of the envelope, CRTs must be handled carefully to avoid injury.

==== Implosion protection ====
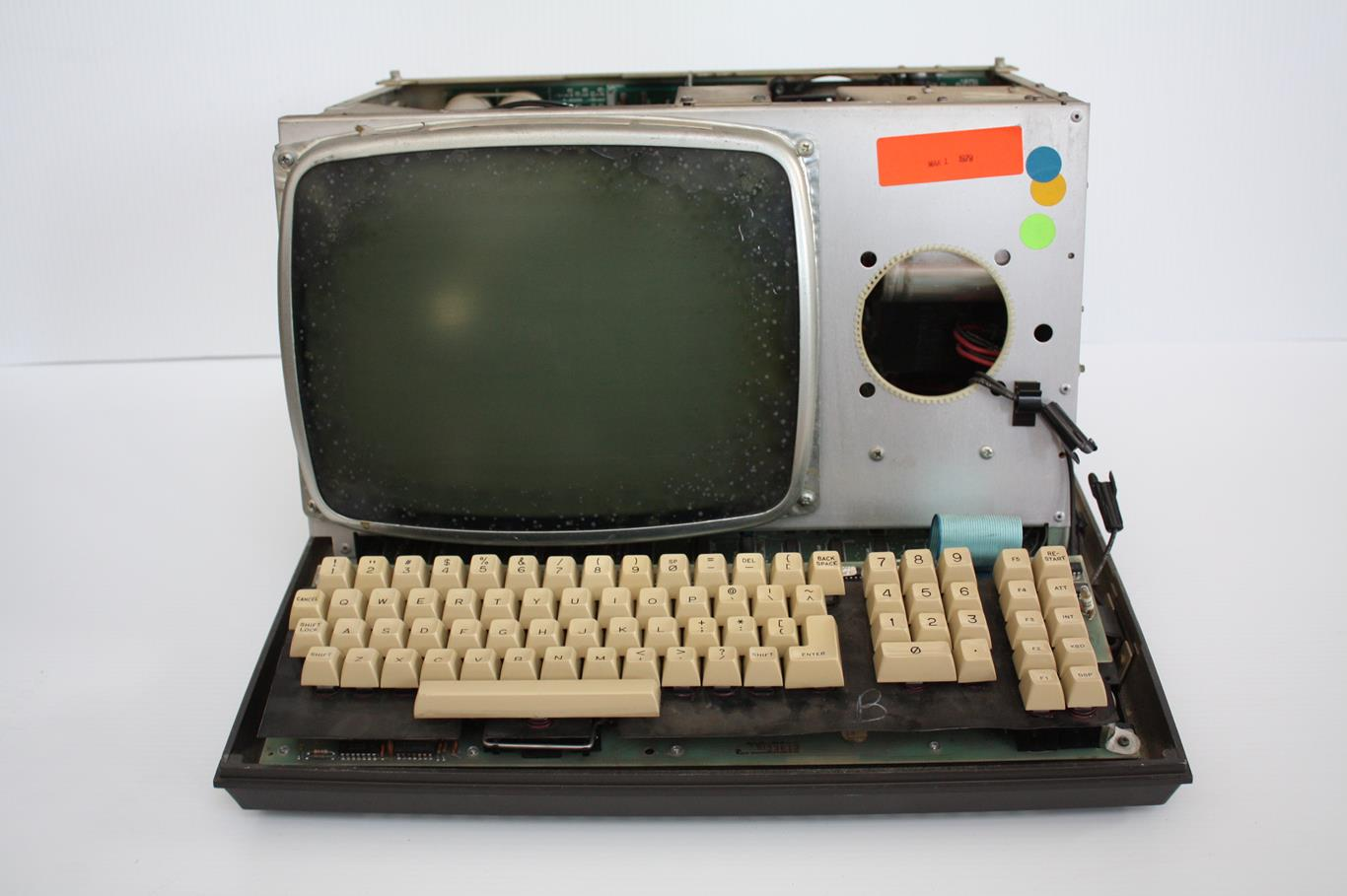
Datapoint 1500 terminal with exposed chassis, with its CRT suffering from a "cataract" due to aging PVA

Early CRTs had a glass plate over the screen that was bonded to it using glue, creating a laminated glass screen: initially the glue was polyvinyl acetate (PVA), while later versions such as the LG Flatron used a resin, possibly a UV-curable resin. The PVA degrades over time creating a "cataract", a ring of degraded glue around the edges of the CRT that does not allow light from the screen to pass through. Later CRTs instead use a tensioned metal rim band mounted around the perimeter that also provides mounting points for the CRT to be mounted to a housing. In a 19-inch CRT, the tensile stress in the rim band is 70 kg/cm^{2}.

Older CRTs were mounted to the TV set using a frame. The band is tensioned by heating it, then mounting it on the CRT; the band cools afterwards, shrinking in size and putting the glass under compression, which strengthens the glass and reduces the necessary thickness (and hence weight) of the glass. This makes the band an integral component that should never be removed from an intact CRT that still has a vacuum; attempting to remove it may cause the CRT to implode.

The rim band prevents the CRT from imploding should the screen be broken. The rim band may be glued to the perimeter of the CRT using epoxy, preventing cracks from spreading beyond the screen and into the funnel.

Alternatively the compression caused by the rim band may be used to cause any cracks in the screen to propagate laterally at a high speed so that they reach the funnel and fully penetrate it before they fully penetrate the screen. This is possible because the funnel has walls that are thinner than the screen. Fully penetrating the funnel first allows air to enter the CRT from a short distance behind the screen, and prevent an implosion by ensuring the screen is fully penetrated by the cracks and breaks only when the CRT already has air.

=== Electric shock ===
To accelerate the electrons from the cathode to the screen with enough energy to achieve sufficient image brightness, a very high voltage (EHT or extra-high tension) is required, from a few thousand volts for a small oscilloscope CRT to tens of thousands for a larger screen color TV. This is many times greater than household power supply voltage. Even after the power supply is turned off, some associated capacitors and the CRT itself may retain a small charge for a brief period of time. Electric shock from the CRT itself is very unlikely.

== Security concerns ==
Under some circumstances, the signal radiated from the electron guns, scanning circuitry, and associated wiring of a CRT can be captured remotely and used to reconstruct what is shown on the CRT using a process called Van Eck phreaking. Special TEMPEST shielding can mitigate this effect. Such radiation of potentially exploitable information, however, occurs also with other display technologies and with electronics in general.

== Recycling ==
Due to the toxins contained in CRT monitors, the United States Environmental Protection Agency (EPA) created rules (in October 2001) stating that CRTs must be brought to special e-waste recycling facilities. In November 2002, the EPA began fining companies that disposed of CRTs through landfills or incineration. Regulatory agencies, local and statewide, monitor the disposal of CRTs and other computer equipment.

As electronic waste, CRTs are considered one of the hardest types to recycle. CRTs have relatively high concentration of lead and phosphors, both of which are necessary for the display. There are several companies in the United States that charge a small fee to collect CRTs, then subsidize their labor by selling the harvested copper, wire, and printed circuit boards. The EPA includes discarded CRT monitors in its category of "hazardous household waste" but considers CRTs that have been set aside for testing to be commodities if they are not discarded, speculatively accumulated, or left unprotected from weather and other damage.

Various states participate in the recycling of CRTs, each with their reporting requirements for collectors and recycling facilities. For example, in California the recycling of CRTs is governed by CALRecycle, the California Department of Resources Recycling and Recovery through their Payment System. Recycling facilities that accept CRT devices from business and the residential sector must obtain contact information such as address and phone number to ensure the CRTs come from a California source in order to participate in the CRT Recycling Payment System.

In Europe, disposal of CRT TVs and monitors is covered by the Waste Electrical and Electronic Equipment Directive (WEEE Directive).

Multiple methods have been proposed for the recycling of CRT glass. The methods involve thermal, mechanical and chemical processes. All proposed methods remove the lead oxide content from the glass. Some companies operated furnaces to separate the lead from the glass. A coalition called the Recytube project was once formed by several European companies to devise a method to recycle CRTs. The phosphors used in CRTs often contain rare earth metals. A CRT contains about 7 grams of phosphor.

The funnel can be separated from the screen of the CRT using laser cutting, diamond saws or wires, or using a resistively heated nichrome wire.

Leaded CRT glass was sold to be remelted into other CRTs, or even broken down and used in road construction or used in tiles, concrete, concrete and cement bricks, fiberglass insulation or used as flux in metals smelting.

A considerable portion of CRT glass is landfilled, where it can pollute the surrounding environment. In California, in 2016, it was more common for CRT glass to be disposed of than recycled.

== See also ==
- Cathodoluminescence
- Crookes tube
- Scintillation (physics)
- Laser-powered phosphor display, similar to a CRT, replaces the electron beam with a laser beam

Applying CRT in different display-purpose:

- Analog television
- Image displaying
- Comparison of CRT, LCD, plasma, and OLED displays
- Overscan

Historical aspects:

- Direct-view bistable storage tube
- Geer tube
- History of display technology
- Image dissector
- LCD television, LED-backlit LCD, LED display
- Penetron
- Surface-conduction electron-emitter display (SED)

Safety and precautions:

- Monitor filter
- Photosensitive epilepsy
- TCO Certified

== Selected patents ==
- U.S. patent 1,691,324: Zworykin Television System
