= Triniscope =

Color television system

The Triniscope was an early color television system developed by RCA. It used three separate video tubes with colored phosphors producing the primary colors, combining the images through dichroic mirrors onto a screen for viewing.

As a consumer system it was enormous, expensive, impractical, and dropped as soon as the shadow mask system was successful. However, the Triniscope idea was used commercially in several niche roles for years, notably as a color replacement for the kinescope, from which it took its name.

The term can also be applied to any projection television system using three tubes, but this use is rare in the literature.

== History ==
=== Color television ===
Color television had been studied even before commercial broadcasting became common, but it was only in the late 1940s that the problem was seriously considered. At the time, a number of systems were being proposed that used separate red, green and blue signals (RGB), broadcast in succession. Most systems broadcast entire frames in sequence, with a colored filter (or "gel") that rotated in front of an otherwise conventional black and white television tube. Because they broadcast separate signals for the different colors, all of these systems were incompatible with existing black and white sets. Another problem was that the mechanical filter made them flicker unless very high refresh rates were used. In spite of these problems, the US Federal Communications Commission (FCC) selected a sequential-frame 144 frame/s standard from CBS as their color broadcast in 1950.

RCA worked along different lines entirely, using the luminance-chrominance system. This system did not directly encode or transmit the RGB signals; instead it first combined the RGB signals from the camera into one overall brightness figure, the "luminance". The luminance signal closely matched the existing black and white broadcasts, and would display properly on existing sets. This was a major advantage over the mechanical systems being proposed by other groups. Color information was then separately encoded and folded into the broadcast signal at high-frequency. On a black and white television this extra information would be seen as a slight randomization of the image intensity, but the limited resolution of existing sets made this invisible in practice. On color sets, a decoder would notice the signal, filter it out from the luminance, and then process it to retrieve the color again.

Although RCA's system had enormous benefits over CBS's, it had not been successfully developed because it proved difficult to produce the display tubes. Compared to the CBS system, where the color changed once a frame at 144 times a second, RCA's system changed the color continually across the line, thousands of times a second, far too fast for a mechanical filter like the CBS design. Instead, the system required small dots of colored phosphor to be deposited on the screen, instead of the even coating used in conventional sets or mechanical color systems. These dots were far too small to be accurately hit by an electron gun.

If a single tube could not be built with the required performance, a solution is to use multiple tubes, one for each color. A wide variety of systems attempted to use this concept, differing primarily in the way they re-combined the images for display.

=== Triniscope ===
RCA's solution was to use three conventional black and white tubes with filters on the front to produce the three primary colors. The tubes were arranged with the green-filtered tube at the bottom of the chassis, facing up. Above it and to one side was the blue-filtered tube. This was aimed at right angles to the green, so light from the two crossed in space between them. At the crossing point, a dichromic mirror was positioned to reflect the blue light up, while allowing the green light to pass through unchanged. Both "beams" were now traveling toward the top of the tube. A third tube and mirror completed the system by adding red to the image. A suitable red phosphor was not available at the time; instead, a red Wratten filter was placed over a tube with bright yellow phosphor, and then neutral filtered to get the proper brightness in relation to the other two tubes. All three signals then shone onto a mirror at the top of the chassis, which reflected the light forward toward the viewer.

There were numerous problems with the arrangement. The first, and most difficult to solve, was that the resulting system was enormous. One example system using three 10-inch kinescope monitors, was 40-inches high, 38-inches wide and 21-inches deep. This was the smallest of the Triniscope models produced with a reasonable display size; others had smaller chassis, but only at the cost of much smaller displays.

The signal was decoded by filtering out the color portion of the signal and sending the left-over luminance signal to all three tubes evenly. The color signal was then used to gate each color tube to the correct brightness levels. This required separate circuits for each tube, and even the most developed example required a total of 44 vacuum tubes in four separate chassis units. The system was expensive, both to build and to keep running. Given the cost and complexity, RCA also built prototype units using a two-color system, orange and cyan. Similar systems had been used to produce low-cost color films as early as the 1920s.

=== NTSC ===
During the early color meetings hosted by the FCC, the selection board made it clear they did not consider the Triniscope to be an acceptable solution. They allowed RCA to use the system in order to illustrate the dot-sequential system, but stated that only a system with a single display tube would be selected. In any event, RCA's displays never produced a reasonable image in testing.

As the FCC meetings evolved into the NTSC, other researchers at RCA were hard at work on the competing shadow mask concept. By the time the next set of presentations was ready, shadow mask tubes using one or three guns were available. These did not fare any better in viewing tests, but critically, it was due to the signaling system, not the tubes. By that point, RCA had abandoned further development of the Triniscope.

=== Further use ===
Although the shadow mask worked, it had a number of practical drawbacks. Notable among these was the dim images it produced as a side-effect of the mask blocking off most of the power from the electron guns. Development of other solutions to the color problem continued throughout the 1950s and 60s, including commercial development of the Triniscope.

The Triniscope was first used as a color analog of the existing kinescope systems it was originally developed from. NBC and Pathé demonstrated a working system as early as 1954. However, in tests the system proved to be only "resonsable" so development continued in order to improve the quality.

However, during the same period the first video tape systems were being introduced, and the expense of the color printing used in the Triniscope made it an expensive option. Improvements in color film technology improved the system and work on the concept continued into the 1970s.

The Triniscope also saw limited development for consumer television use. One example is the Mitsubishi 6CT-338, which used three 5-inch CRTs arranged behind a faux screen on the front of the display. The image was viewable as a small image centered within the larger faux screen. Using three separate tube resulted in image brightness no shadow mask set could match, but because the image was "behind" the front of the display, the system had a limited display angle.

== See also ==
- Geer tube, used three guns in a single tube to produce color
- Shadow mask, the first really successful color television design, and the basis for the vast majority of televisions produced before 2000
- Chromatron, Penetron and beam-index tube were contemporaries of the shadow mask that did not see widespread use
- Aperture grille, the only really successful competitor to the shadow mask
