= Large-screen television technology =

Technology rapidly developed in the late 1990s and 2000s

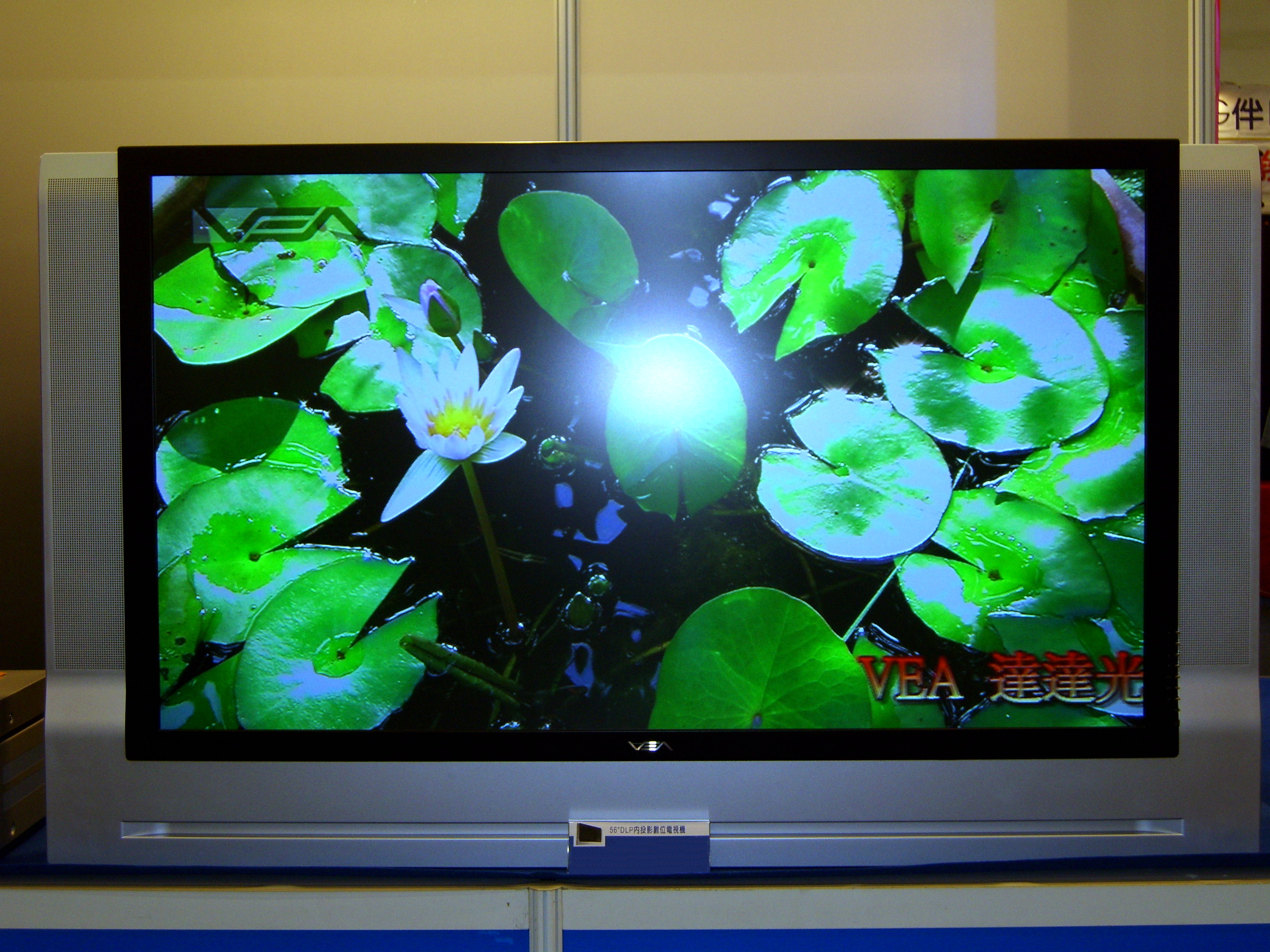
A 140 cm (56 in) DLP rear-projection TV

Large-screen television technology (colloquially big-screen TV) developed rapidly in the late 1990s and 2000s. Prior to the development of thin-screen technologies, rear-projection television was standard for larger displays, and jumbotron, a non-projection video display technology, was used at stadiums and concerts. Thin-screen technologies include liquid crystal display (LCD), plasma display (PDP) organic light-emitting diode (OLED).

Large-screen technologies have almost completely displaced cathode-ray tubes (CRT) in television sales due to improved picture quality and the necessary bulkiness of cathode ray tubes. The diagonal screen size of a CRT television is limited to about 100 cm (40 in). Because of the size requirements of the cathode-ray tube, which fires three beams of electrons onto the screen to create a viewable image, a large-screen TV requires a longer tube, making a large-screen CRT TV of about 130 to 200 cm (50 to 80 in) unrealistic.

== Viewing distances ==
Horizontal, vertical and diagonal field of view

Before deciding on a particular display technology size, it is very important to determine from what distances it is going to be viewed. As the display size increases so does the ideal viewing distance. Bernard J. Lechner, while working for RCA, studied the best viewing distances for various conditions and derived the so-called Lechner distance.

As a rule of thumb, the viewing distance should be roughly two to three times the screen size for standard definition (SD) displays.

Screen size (in)	Viewing distance (ft)	Viewing distance (m)
15–26	5–8	1.5-2.4
26–32	8–11.5	2.4-3.5
32–42	11.5–13	3.5-4
42–55	>13	>4

== Display specifications ==
The following are important factors for evaluating television displays:

- Display size: the diagonal length of the display.
- Display resolution: the number of pixels in each dimension on a display. In general a higher resolution will yield a clearer, sharper image.
- Dot pitch: This is the size of an individual pixel, which includes the length of the subpixels and distances between subpixels. It can be measured as the horizontal or diagonal length of a pixel. A smaller dot pitch generally results in sharper images because there are more pixels in a given area. In the case of CRT displays, pixels are not equivalent to the phosphor dots, as they are to the pixel triads in LCDs. Projection displays that use three monochrome CRTs do not have a dot structure, so this specification does not apply.
- Response time: The time it takes for the display to respond to a given input. For an LCD it is defined as the total time it takes for a pixel to transition from black to white, and then white to black. A display with slow response times displaying moving pictures may result in blurring and distortion. Displays with fast response times can make better transitions in displaying moving objects without unwanted image artefacts.
- Brightness: The amount of light emitted from the display. It is sometimes synonymous with the term luminance, which is defined as the amount of light per area and is measured in SI units as candela per square meter.
- Contrast ratio: The ratio of the luminance of the brightest color to the luminance of the darkest color on the display. High contrast ratios are desirable but the method of measurement varies greatly. It can be measured with the display isolated from its environment or with the lighting of the room being accounted for. Static contrast ratio is measured on a static image at some instant in time. Dynamic contrast ratio is measured on the image over a period of time. Manufacturers can market either static or dynamic contrast ratio depending on which one is higher.
- Aspect ratio: The ratio of the display width to the display height. The aspect ratio of a traditional television is 4:3, which is being discontinued; the television industry is currently changing to the 16:9 ratio typically used by large-screen, high-definition televisions.
- Viewing angle: The maximum angle at which the display can be viewed with acceptable quality. The angle is measured from one direction to the opposite direction of the display, such that the maximum viewing angle is 180 degrees. Outside of this angle the viewer will see a distorted version of the image being displayed. The definition of what is acceptable quality for the image can be different among manufacturers and display types. Many manufacturers define this as the point at which the luminance is half of the maximum luminance. Some manufacturers define it based on contrast ratio and look at the angle at which a certain contrast ratio is realized.
- Color reproduction/gamut: The range of colors that the display can accurately represent.

== Display technologies ==
=== LCD television ===
A pixel on an LCD consists of multiple layers of components: two polarizing filters, two glass plates with electrodes, and liquid crystal molecules. The liquid crystals are sandwiched between the glass plates and are in direct contact with the electrodes. The two polarizing filters are the outer layers in this structure. The polarity of one of these filters is oriented horizontally, while the polarity of the other filter is oriented vertically. The electrodes are treated with a layer of polymer to control the alignment of liquid crystal molecules in a particular direction. These rod-like molecules are arranged to match the horizontal orientation on one side and the vertical orientation on the other, giving the molecules a twisted, helical structure. Twisted nematic liquid crystals are naturally twisted, and are commonly used for LCDs because they react predictably to temperature variation and electric current.

When the liquid crystal material is in its natural state, light passing through the first filter will be rotated (in terms of polarity) by the twisted molecule structure, which allows the light to pass through the second filter. When voltage is applied across the electrodes, the liquid crystal structure is untwisted to an extent determined by the amount of voltage. A sufficiently large voltage will cause the molecules to untwist completely, such that the polarity of any light passing through will not be rotated and will instead be perpendicular to the filter polarity. This filter will block the passage of light because of the difference in polarity orientation, and the resulting pixel will be black. The amount of light allowed to pass through at each pixel can be controlled by varying the corresponding voltage accordingly. In a color LCD each pixel consists of red, green, and blue subpixels, which require appropriate color filters in addition to the components mentioned previously. Each subpixel can be controlled individually to display a large range of possible colors for a particular pixel.

The electrodes on one side of the LCD are arranged in columns, while the electrodes on the other side are arranged in rows, forming a large matrix that controls every pixel. Each pixel is designated a unique row-column combination, and the pixel can be accessed by the control circuits using this combination. These circuits send charge down the appropriate row and column, effectively applying a voltage across the electrodes at a given pixel. Simple LCDs such as those on digital watches can operate on what is called a passive-matrix structure, in which each pixel is addressed one at a time. This results in extremely slow response times and poor voltage control. A voltage applied to one pixel can cause the liquid crystals at surrounding pixels to untwist undesirably, resulting in fuzziness and poor contrast in this area of the image. LCDs with high resolutions, such as large-screen LCD televisions, require an active-matrix structure. This structure is a matrix of thin-film transistors, each corresponding to one pixel on the display. The switching ability of the transistors allows each pixel to be accessed individually and precisely, without affecting nearby pixels. Each transistor also acts as a capacitor while leaking very little current, so it can effectively store the charge while the display is being refreshed.

The following are types of LCD technologies:

- Twisted Nematic (TN): This type of display is the most common and makes use of twisted nematic-phase crystals, which have a natural helical structure and can be untwisted by an applied voltage to allow light to pass through. These displays have low production costs and fast response times but also limited viewing angles, and many have a limited color gamut that cannot take full advantage of advanced graphics cards. These limitations are due to variation in the angles of the liquid crystal molecules at different depths, restricting the angles at which light can leave the pixel.
- In-Plane Switching (IPS): Unlike the electrode arrangement in traditional TN displays, the two electrodes corresponding to a pixel are both on the same glass plate and are parallel to each other. The liquid crystal molecules do not form a helical structure and instead are also parallel to each other. In its natural or "off" state, the molecule structure is arranged parallel to the glass plates and electrodes. Because the twisted molecule structure is not used in an IPS display, the angle at which light leaves a pixel is not as restricted, and therefore viewing angles and color reproduction are much improved compared to those of TN displays. However, IPS displays have slower response times. IPS displays also initially suffered from poor contrast ratios but has been significantly improved with the development of Advanced Super IPS (AS – IPS).
- Multi-Domain Vertical Alignment (MVA): In this type of display the liquid crystals are naturally arranged perpendicular to the glass plates but can be rotated to control light passing through. There are also pyramid-like protrusions in the glass substrates to control the rotation of the liquid crystals such that the light is channeled at an angle with the glass plate. This technology results in wide viewing angles while boasting good contrast ratios and faster response times than those of TN and IPS displays. The major drawback is a reduction in brightness.
- Patterned Vertical Alignment (PVA): This type of display is a variation of MVA and performs very similarly, but with much higher contrast ratios.

=== Plasma display ===
Composition of plasma display panel

A plasma display is made up of many thousands of gas-filled cells that are sandwiched in between two glass plates, two sets of electrodes, dielectric material, and protective layers. The address electrodes are arranged vertically between the rear glass plate and a protective layer. This structure sits behind the cells in the rear of the display, with the protective layer in direct contact with the cells. On the front side of the display there are horizontal display electrodes that sit in between a magnesium-oxide (MgO) protective layer and an insulating dielectric layer. The MgO layer is in direct contact with the cells and the dielectric layer is in direct contact with the front glass plate. The horizontal and vertical electrodes form a grid from which each individual cell can be accessed. Each individual cell is walled off from surrounding cells so that activity in one cell does not affect another. The cell structure is similar to a honeycomb structure except with rectangular cells.

To illuminate a particular cell, the electrodes that intersect at the cell are charged by control circuitry and electric current flows through the cell, stimulating the gas (typically xenon and neon) atoms inside the cell. These ionized gas atoms, or plasmas, then release ultraviolet photons that interact with a phosphor material on the inside wall of the cell. The phosphor atoms are stimulated and electrons jump to higher energy levels. When these electrons return to their natural state, energy is released in the form of visible light. Every pixel on the display is made up of three subpixel cells. One subpixel cell is coated with red phosphor, another is coated with green phosphor, and the third cell is coated with blue phosphor. Light emitted from the subpixel cells is blended together to create an overall color for the pixel. The control circuitry can manipulate the intensity of light emitted from each cell, and therefore can produce a large gamut of colors. Light from each cell can be controlled and changed rapidly to produce a high-quality moving picture.

=== Projection television ===
A projection television uses a projector to create a small image from a video signal and magnify this image onto a viewable screen. The projector uses a bright beam of light and a lens system to project the image to a much larger size. A front-projection television uses a projector that is separate from the screen which could be a suitably prepared wall, and the projector is placed in front of the screen. The setup of a rear-projection television is similar to that of a traditional television in that the projector is contained inside the television box and projects the image from behind the screen.

==== Rear-projection television ====
The following are different types of rear-projection televisions, which differ based on the type of projector and how the image (before projection) is created:

- CRT rear-projection television: Small cathode ray tubes create the image in the same manner that a traditional CRT television does, which is by firing a beam of electrons onto a phosphor-coated screen; the image is projected onto a large screen. This is done to overcome the cathode-ray tube size limit which is about 100 cm (40 in), the maximum size for a normal direct-view-CRT television set (see image). The projection cathode ray tubes can be arranged in various ways. One arrangement is to use one tube and three phosphor (red, green, blue) coatings. Alternatively, one black-and-white tube can be used with a spinning color wheel. A third option is to use three CRTs, one each for red, green, and blue.
- LCD rear-projection television: A lamp transmits light through a small LCD chip made up of individual pixels to create an image. The LCD projector uses dichroic mirrors to take the light and create three separate red, green, and blue beams, which are then passed through three separate LCD panels. The liquid crystals are manipulated using electric current to control the amount of light passing through. The lens system combines the three color images and projects them.
- DLP rear-projection television: A DLP projector creates an image using a digital micromirror device (DMD chip), which on its surface contains a large matrix of microscopic mirrors, each corresponding to one pixel (or sub-pixel) in an image. Each mirror can be tilted to reflect light such that the pixel appears bright, or the mirror can be tilted to direct light elsewhere (where it is absorbed) to make the pixel appear dark. Mirrors flip between light and dark positions, so subpixel brightness is controlled by proportionally varying the amount of time a mirror is in the bright position; its pulse-width modulation. The mirror is made of aluminum and is mounted on a torsion-supported yoke. There are electrodes on both sides of the yoke that control the tilt of the mirror using electrostatic attraction. The electrodes are connected to an SRAM cell located under each pixel, and charges from the SRAM cell move the mirrors. Color is created by a spinning color wheel (used with a single-chip projector) or a three-chip (red, green, blue) projector. The color wheel is placed between the lamp light source and the DMD chip such that the light passing through is colored and then reflected off the mirror array to determine brightness. A color wheel consists of a red, green, and blue sector, as well as a fourth sector to either control brightness or include a fourth color. This spinning color wheel in the single-chip arrangement can be replaced by red, green, and blue light-emitting diodes (LED). The three-chip projector uses a prism to split up the light into three beams (red, green, blue), each directed towards its own DMD chip. The outputs of the three DMD chips are recombined and then projected.

=== Laser Phosphor Display ===
Laser Phosphor Display (LPD) technology combines qualities of a laser TV and cathode ray tube display. Instead of using electron guns to excite red, green, and blue phosphors on a screen, a laser phosphor display excites the phosphors on a screen using an array of ultra-violet lasers. LPDs have been marketed by Prysm (the patent holder) as a large-format modular display technology for advertising displays and video walls since 2010, where they have power consumption advantages over an equivalent liquid-crystal display.

Compared to a cathode-ray tube, the use of a laser array instead of electron guns requires several mirrors (a galvanometer and polygonal mirror) to move the lasers to create a raster pattern, since a magnetron is ineffective at moving laser arrays. Much like a CRT, the screen and emitters must be aligned to produce a correct image. The Prysm implementation of a laser phosphor display is more similar to a beam-index tube than conventional shadow mask or aperture grille CRT display, since index markers are used to ensure that laser beams fall on the correct color stripe.

While large-format cathode-ray tube displays typically utilized rear projection with associated reduction in overall brightness, a laser phosphor display has brightness levels more comparable to a direct-view CRT, since light-producing phosphors are directly positioned on the glass display panel. The technology requires significantly deeper housing than a typical LCD panel due to the space required for the mirror and laser assembly, but can be narrower than a typical cathode-ray tube.

Much like a CRT, no backlight is used, and lasers can be turned off when a scene with a large amount of black content is displayed. For smaller runs of black content, the laser remains active at a low power level.

== Comparison of television display technologies ==
=== CRT ===
Though large-screen CRT TVs/monitors exist, the screen size is limited by their impracticality. The bigger the screen, the greater the weight, and the deeper the CRT. A typical 80 cm (32 in) television can weigh about 70 kg (150 lb) or more. The Sony PVM-4300 monitor weighs 200 kg (440 lb) and has the largest ever CRT with a 110 cm (43 in) diagonal display. SlimFit televisions exist, but are not common.

=== LCD ===
Advantages

- Slim profile
- Lighter and less bulky than rear-projection televisions
- Is less susceptible to burn-in: Burn-in refers to the television displaying a permanent ghost-like image due to constant, prolonged display of the image. Light-emitting phosphors lose their luminosity over time and, when frequently used, the low-luminosity areas become permanently visible.
- LCDs reflect very little light, allowing them to maintain contrast levels in well-lit rooms and not be affected by glare.
- Slightly lower power usage than equivalent sized plasma displays.
- Can be wall-mounted.

Disadvantages

- Poor black level: Some light passes through even when liquid crystals completely untwist, so the best black color that can be achieved is varying shades of dark gray, resulting in worse contrast ratios and detail in the image. This can be mitigated by the use of a matrix of LEDs as the illuminator to provide nearly true black performance.
- Narrower viewing angles than competing technologies. It is nearly impossible to use an LCD without some image warping occurring.
- LCDs rely heavily on thin-film transistors, which can be damaged, resulting in a defective pixel.
- Typically have slower response times than plasmas, which can cause ghosting and blurring during the display of fast-moving images. This is also improving by increasing the refresh rate of LCDs.

=== Plasma display ===
Advantages

- Slim cabinet profile
- Can be wall-mounted
- Lighter and less voluminous than rear-projection television sets
- More accurate color reproduction than that of an LCD; 68 billion (2^{36}) colors vs. 16.7 million (2^{24}) colors
- Produces deep, true blacks, allowing for superior contrast ratios (+ 1:1,000,000)
- Wider viewing angles (+178°) than those of an LCD; the image does not degrade (dim and distort) when viewed from a high angle, as occurs with an LCD
- No motion blur; eliminated with higher refresh rates and faster response times (up to 1.0 microsecond), which make plasma TV technology ideal for viewing the fast-moving film and sport images

Disadvantages

- No longer being manufactured
- Susceptible to screen burn-in and image retention; late-model plasma TV sets feature corrective technology, such as pixel shifting
- Phosphor-luminosity diminishes over time, resulting in the gradual decline of absolute image-brightness; corrected with the 60,000-hour life-span of contemporary plasma TV technology (longer than that of CRT technology)
- Not manufactured in sizes smaller than 94 cm (37 in) diagonal
- Susceptible to reflective glare in a brightly lighted room, which dims the image
- High electrical power consumption
- Heavier than a comparable LCD TV set, because of the glass screen that contains the gases
- Costlier screen repair; the glass screen of a plasma TV set can be damaged permanently, and is more difficult to repair than the plastic screen of an LCD TV set

=== Projection television ===
==== Front-projection television ====
Advantages

- Significantly cheaper than flat-panel counterparts
- Front-projection picture quality approaches that of movie theater
- Front-projection televisions take up very little space because a projector screen is extremely slim, and even a suitably prepared wall can be used
- Display size can be extremely large, typically limited by room height.

Disadvantages

- Front-projection more difficult to set up because projector is separate and must be placed in front of the screen, typically on the ceiling
- Lamp may need to be replaced after heavy usage
- Image brightness is an issue, may require darkened room.

==== Rear-projection television ====
Advantages

- Significantly cheaper than flat-panel counterparts
- Projectors that are not phosphor-based (LCD/DLP) are not susceptible to burn-in
- Rear-projection is not subject to glare

Disadvantages

- Rear-projection televisions are much bulkier than flat-panel televisions
- Lamp may need to be replaced after heavy usage
- Rear-projection has smaller viewing angles than those of flat-panel displays

== Comparison of different types of rear-projection televisions ==
=== CRT projector ===
Advantages:

- Achieves excellent black level and contrast ratio
- Achieves excellent color reproduction
- CRTs have generally very long lifetimes
- Greater viewing angles than those of LCDs

Disadvantages:

- Heavy and large, especially depth-wise
- If one CRT fails the other two should be replaced for optimal color and brightness balance
- Susceptible to burn-in because CRT is phosphor-based
- Needs to be "converged" (primary colors positioned so they overlay without color fringes) annually (or after set relocation)
- May display colour halos or lose focus

=== LCD projector ===
Advantages:

- Smaller than CRT projectors
- LCD chip can be easily repaired or replaced
- Is not susceptible to burn-in

Disadvantages:

- The Screen-door effect: Individual pixels may be visible on the large screen, giving the appearance that the viewer is looking through a screen door.
- Possibility of defective pixels
- Poor black level: Some light passes through even when liquid crystals completely untwist, so the best black color that can be achieved is a very dark gray, resulting in worse contrast ratios and detail in the image. Some newer models use an adjustable iris to help offset this.
- Not as slim as DLP projection television
- Uses lamps for light, lamps may need to be replaced
- Fixed number of pixels, other resolutions need to be scaled to fit this
- Limited viewing angles

=== DLP projector ===
Advantages:

- Slimmest of all types of projection televisions
- Achieves excellent black level and contrast ratio
- DMD chip can be easily repaired or replaced
- Is not susceptible to burn-in
- Better viewing angles than those of CRT projectors
- Image brightness only decreases due to the age of the lamp
- Defective pixels are rare
- Does not experience the screen-door effect

Disadvantages:

- Uses lamps for light, lamps need to be replaced on average once every year and a half to two years. Current models with LED lamps reduce or eliminate this. Estimated lifetime of LED lamps is over 100,000 hours.
- Fixed number of pixels, other resolutions need to be scaled to fit this. This is a limitation only when compared with CRT displays.
- The Rainbow Effect: This is an unwanted visual artifact that is described as flashes of colored light seen when the viewer looks across the display from one side to the other. This artifact is unique to single-chip DLP projectors. The Rainbow Effect is significant only in DLP displays that use a single white lamp with a "color wheel" that is synchronized with the display of red, green and blue components. LED illumination systems that use discrete red, green and blue LEDs in concert with the display of red, green and blue components at high frequency reduce, or altogether eliminate, the Rainbow effect.

== See also ==
- Comparison of display technologies
- Video wall
- LED TV
- TFT-LCD, a detailed discussion of LCD panel technology
