= Telechrome =

Color television system

Telechrome was the first all-electronic single-tube color television system. It was invented by well-known Scottish television engineer, John Logie Baird, who had previously made the first public television broadcast, as well as the first color broadcast using a pre-Telechrome system.

Telechrome used two electron guns aimed at either side of a thin, semi-transparent mica sheet. One of the sides was covered in cyan phosphor and the other red-orange, producing a limited color gamut, but well suited to displaying skin tones. With minor modifications, the system could also be used to produce 3D images. Telechrome was selected as the basis for a UK-wide television standard by a committee in 1944, but the difficult task of converting the two-color system to three-color RGB was still under way when Baird died in 1946.

The introduction of the shadow mask design by RCA produced a workable solution for color television, albeit one with considerably less image brightness. Interest in alternative systems like the Telechrome or Geer tube faded by the late 1950s. The only alternatives to see widespread use were General Electric's slot-mask, and Sony's Trinitron, both were modifications of the RCA concept. All CRT-based methods have since been almost completely replaced by LCD television, starting in the 1990s.

== Background ==
=== Mechanical and hybrid color ===
Baird performed one of the earliest public demonstrations of color television system on 3 July 1928 using an all-mechanical system with three Nipkow disk scanners synchronized with a single disk on the receiving end and three colored lights that were turned on and off in synchronicity with the broadcaster. The same basic system was used on 4 February 1938 to create the first color broadcast transmissions from The Crystal Palace to the Dominion Theatre in London. Baird was not the only one to experiment with mechanical color television, and a number of similar devices were demonstrated throughout this period, but Baird is recorded as the first to show a real over-the-air transmission in a public demonstration.

In 1940 he introduced a much better solution using a system known today as hybrid color. This used a traditional black and white CRT with a rotating colored filter in front. Three frames, sent one after the other in a system known as sequential scan, were displayed on the CRT while the colored wheel was spun in synchronicity. This design was physically very long, leading to deep receiver chassis, but later versions folded the optical path using mirrors to produce a somewhat more practical system. Again, Baird was not the only one to produce such a system, with CBS displaying a very similar system at almost the same time. However, Baird was not happy with the design later stated that a fully electronic device would be better.

=== Fully electronic systems ===
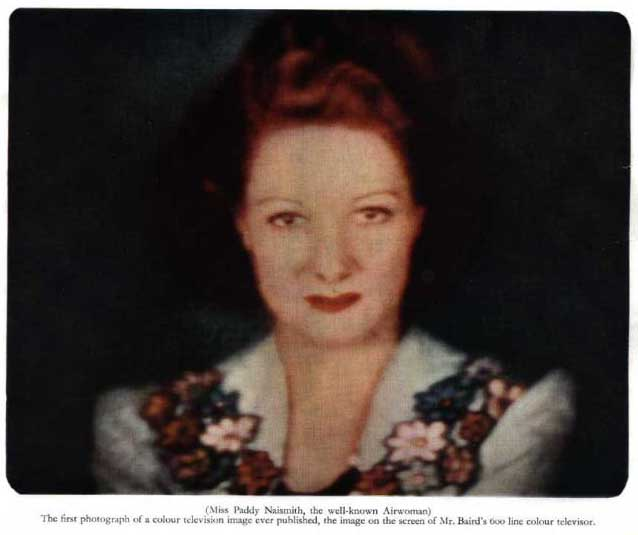
This live image of Paddy Naismith was used to demonstrate Baird's first all-electronic color television system, which used two projection CRTs. The two-color image would be similar to the basic telechrome system. Note that the green in Paddy's blouse reproduces very poorly as a dark, grayish cyan. Baird's two-color method can't reproduce true greens or blues.

The basic problem facing designers of color televisions was this: sending each frame of the moving image meant sending three complete images, one each for red, green and blue. Sequential systems, like Baird's earlier efforts, sent the three images one after another. In order for motion to appear smooth, images must change at least 16 times a second. To reduce flicker, over 40 frames per second (fps) is mandatory. For this reason, very high refresh (field) rates were necessary. CBS' system refreshed at 144 fps, 48 fps for each individual color. Peter Carl Goldmark's CBS team tried several field rates. Within the 6 MHz allowable channel bandwidth, the most acceptable rate was 144 fps. This rate made the picture signal incompatible with existing systems working at 50 or 60 Hz.

A system sending all three signals at the same time at a conventional refresh rate would be greatly preferable. Transmitting such a signal could be accomplished by using three camera tubes, each with a color filter in front of them, using mirrors or prisms to aim at the same scene through a single lens. Each signal would then be separately broadcast using three conventional TV channels, and using the luminance concept, one of those could be received on a conventional black and white set. This would use a considerable amount of bandwidth, but this was a small cost in the era of only a few television channels.

The problem, however, was how to combine the three separate signals back into a single display. The system used in the cameras, with three separate tubes combined together optically, was not practical due to the cost of a receiver set with three CRTs as well as the unwieldily chassis needed to contain them. One such example was the RCA Triniscope, which produced useful images but was extremely complex, required constant adjustment, and was the size of a contemporary refrigerator to produce a 10 inches (250 mm) display. A number of experiments were carried out using more conventional tubes and then filtering them, but the low output of the CRTs produced very dim images that were dismissed as impractical.

Baird had previously worked on a high-intensity CRT system known as the "teapot tube" that saw some use in the UK and US as a projection system in theatres. These were normally built with two such CRTs side-by-side, with one acting as a hot backup in case the primary tube failed. In 1941 Baird converted a teapot projector to produce a two-color image by placing filters in front of the two tubes and projecting them onto a smaller screen to improve the effective intensity. He first showed this in 1941, and in 1942 the BBC described the resulting color image as "entirely natural". The image, of Paddy Naismith, is the first known image of color television to be published.

A projection system with two CRTs was better than three, but still not practical for a home receiver. Baird continued to consider other solutions. One used a single conventional CRT with the two images displayed in a single frame, with the top half of the image containing the image for one color and the bottom the other. Lens systems focused on the display were positioned to see only the top or bottom image, passed them through filters, and then recombined them on a screen. There were drawings showing a similar system with three frames. Like many similar efforts from other experimenters, Baird abandoned this approach.

== Two-gun Telechrome ==
Still searching for a single-tube solution that was bright enough for direct viewing, in 1942 Baird hit upon the Telechrome concept. His solution was essentially to combine two tubes into one large spherical enclosure. In the center of the enclosure was a translucent mica sheet forming the display, covered on one side with cyan phosphor, the other with an orange-red color, producing a limited but useful color gamut. Two electron guns arranged on either side of the screen fired at it, producing the two colors. The image was viewed from one side, seeing one of the colors directly and the other being transmitted through the screen from the other side. This was the first single-tube color television system.

The earliest test models used screens only a few inches across and had the guns arranged almost at right angles to it, making for a very large tube. Later models were built inside very large Hackbridge-Hewittic (H-H) vacuum tubes, which the company originally designed for use as high-power rectifiers in power supplies. Arthur Johnson, a glass blower who had previously worked for both Baird and H-H, produced the new models. These had screens ten inches across, comparable to monochrome screens of the era. The guns fired upward at about a 45 degree angle, allowing them to sit below the display in the chassis. As was the case in the teapot tube, the necks were very long.

Baird also demonstrated the use of the two-gun tube as the basis for stereoscopic 3D television. Baird's image pickup was a flying-spot scanner. This scanner produced alternating blue-green and orange-red scanning beams. Beam separation provided the necessary parallax for anaglyph stereo pictures. Viewers wore colored glasses. The glasses steered the images: One eye saw only the orange-red image. The other eye saw only the blue-green image. This stereoscopic viewing method is identical to the process in Anaglyph 3D movies.

== Three-gun Telechrome ==
The colour gamut of the two-gun system was limited, unable to produce strong greens or blues. To produce a wider gamut, a system using the three primary colours would be needed. For two colours one can aim at either side of the screen, but for three there is no "third side" that can be used. Baird's solution used a variation on his two-colour system, using one side of the screen as-is, and patterning the other side with a series of horizontal triangular ridges. One gun, normally shown as red in most diagrams, fired onto the flat side of the screen, as in the two-colour model. The other two guns were arranged above and below the ridged side of the screen, so they fired onto one side or the other of the ridges. These were coloured green and blue. When all three guns fired, the image would be combined into a single display.

The problem with this approach was that it was very difficult to focus the electron guns on the ridges without the signal bleeding over to the ridges on either side. This problem was compounded by the changing angle between the gun and the ridges as the signal progressed down the screen. Similar designs were attempted by a number of researchers, the best known was the Geer tube that used pyramid-shaped patterns with three guns arranged around the back. None of these systems could ever be made to work reliably, with focusing and alignment being continual problems.

There is no documentary evidence that a successful version of the three-gun Telechrome tube was ever built, although images of Baird holding what is claimed to be a prototype are widely duplicated. The image shows a three-neck tube, but the third neck is the original Hewittic port, now used to hold the internal screen. Burns published a typical photo of the two-gun, three-neck tube.

Baird also described a 3D system using the ridged tube that eliminated the need for glasses. In this case, the tube was rotated so the peaks ran vertically instead of horizontally and the red gun was removed. The guns formerly used for green and blue were now used for left and right images. The basic concept is identical to the lenticular printing system used in magazines and other printed materials to produce 3D images. However, there is no evidence such a system was ever trialled.

== Public demonstrations ==
Baird gave a number of demonstrations of the two-color system throughout the war, and held a full press demonstration on 12 August 1944. These were generally reported in glowing terms, notably an October 1944 report in Electronics that described the images as bright and the 3D effect "excellent".

Not all reports were so positive. One concluded that Baird had "done a real service in demonstrating the value of colour television", but suggested that the two-color system would ultimately have to be replaced with a three-color system. They went on to note:

Apart from the coated mica screen, we do not think any new invention has been demonstrated, and we consider that development on a scale far beyond the capabilities of Mr. Baird's present organisation is necessary for successful results.

They also dismissed the 3D work, which Baird had apparently ended by this point, as a "stunt".

== Telechrome and the Hankey Committee ==
In 1943, with the war clearly turning in the Allies favor, Winston Churchill formed a series of committees to consider post-war redevelopment. Among these were plans to re-open the Alexandra Palace broadcaster, and more widely, nationwide television. To consider this, in September 1943 Churchill formed the Television Committee, better known to history as the Hankey Committee.

The Committee met numerous times during the next year, and asked Baird to prepare a number of papers on the topic of post-war broadcasting. Among his suggestions, he stated that the BBC's monopoly should be ended and independent broadcasters should be licensed, which was delivered along with a request to start such a service. The Committee agreed with this position. He also described the Telechrome system, and this appears to have had a great impact on the Committee.

In his comments to the Hankey Television Committee, Baird suggested two-color, 1,000-line pictures. Such pictures would have required considerable radio bandwidth. The pictures would be incompatible with the pre-war, EMI / BBC, 405-line system. Before the Hankey Committee, Baird also considered the possibility of compatible color systems. In December 1944, the committee delivered its preliminary report. The report called for a system that had "on the order of 1,000 lines" of resolution. The system would optionally be capable of color and 3D displays. The system also be able to run beside the pre-war 405-line system by Marconi and EMI.

Baird was called to a 29 February 1944 meeting of Cable and Wireless (C&W) to discuss the formation of a color television studio. After some discussion, C&W chairman Edward Wilshaw noted that there was an agreement in place that precluded Marconi from entering the market until 1949, which would place them at a significant disadvantage compared to other companies. He suggested that the matter be deferred, as any immediate changes would produce friction between C&W, the General Post Office and the BBC. The matter was dropped, and it would not be until the Television Act 1954 that the possibility was again considered.

== Telechrome ends ==
From 1944 Baird was suffering from increasingly poor health, and late that year he suffered an attack of fever that left him almost invalid. Nevertheless, he formed a new company, John Logie Baird Ltd., with offices and labs in a downtown London house. Baird visited the lab less and less frequently over time, and his wife noticed why in a November 1945 visit when he was seen to have to stop and pant after climbing every stair of the building's four stories. He caught a cold over Christmas 1945, and suffered a stroke in February 1946. He was ordered bedridden but refused to stay there, and continued to deteriorate until his death on 14 June.

Telechrome died with Baird, but the company by this time had introduced its first truly successful product. This combined a 27 inches (690 mm) black and white television, a radio receiver and a record-changing record player in a single large cabinet. The company was purchased in 1948 and switched hands several times, eventually being used as a brand name by Thorn Electrical Industries for a time.

== Telechrome and Trinitron ==
Many years later, former Baird employee Edward Anderson was quoted as saying that they "had the equivalent of the Sony Trinitron tube on the drawing board". This has been used by a number of non-technical authors to suggest that the Trinitron is in some way technically related to the Telechrome in spite of the two systems having nothing in common.

== Patents ==
- UK 562168, John Logie Baird, "Improvements in Colour Television", issued 1944-06-21
