= Penetron =

Limited gamut color television

The penetron, short for penetration tube, is a type of limited-color television used in some military applications. Unlike a conventional color television, the penetron produces a limited color gamut, typically two colors and their combination. Penetrons, and other military-only cathode-ray tubes (CRTs), have been replaced by LCDs in modern designs.

== History ==
=== Basic television ===
A conventional black and white television (B&W) uses a tube that is uniformly coated with a phosphor on the inside face. When excited by high-speed electrons, the phosphor gives off light, typically white but other colors are also used in certain circumstances. An electron gun at the back of the tube provides a beam of high-speed electrons, and a set of electromagnets arranged near the gun allow the beam to be moved about the display. The television signal is sent as a series of stripes, each one of which is displayed as a separate line on the display. The strength of the signal increases or decreases the current in the beam, producing bright or dark points on the display as the beam sweeps across the tube.

In a color display, the uniform coating of white phosphor is replaced by dots or lines of three colored phosphors, producing red, green or blue light (RGB) when excited. These primary colors mix in the human eye to produce a single apparent color. This presents a problem for conventional electron guns, which cannot be focused or positioned accurately enough to hit these much smaller individual patterns. A number of companies were working on various solutions to this problem in the late 1940s, using three separate tubes or a single white-output with colored filters placed in front of it. None of these proved practical and this was a field of considerable development interest.

=== Penetron ===
The penetron was original designed by Koller and Williams while working at General Electric (GE). It was initially developed as a novel way to build a single-gun color television with the simplicity of a conventional B&W set. Like the B&W tube, it used a uniform coating of phosphor on the display with a single electron gun at the rear. However, the phosphor coating is applied in three layers of different colors, red on the inside closest to the gun, then green, and blue on the outside closest to the front face of the tube. Colors were selected by increasing the power of the electron beam, which allowed the electrons to flow through any lower layers to reach the proper color.

In a conventional set, voltage is used to control the brightness of the image, not its color, something that the new design also had to achieve. In the penetron, voltage is also used to select the color. To address these competing needs, the color selection was provided by an external mechanism. The gun was modulated by voltage as it would be in a B&W set, with increasing power producing a brighter spot on the screen. A set of fine wires placed behind the screen then provided extra energy needed to select a particular color layer. Since the phosphors were relatively opaque, the system required very high accelerating voltages, between 25 and 40 kV. An improved version was introduced that used transparent phosphor layers and thin insulating layers between them that reduced the required voltages. The dielectric ensured that stray electrons, either off-voltage from the guns or secondary emission from the phosphors themselves, were stopped before they reached the screen.

The penetron was ideally suited for use with the early CBS broadcast system, which sent color information as three separate sequential frames. CBS' experimental televisions used a mechanical filter with three color sections that spun in front of a B&W tube. The same timing signal was used in the penetron to change the voltage of the color selection grid, to the same end. The low switching rate, 144 times a second, meant that the changing high-voltage was not a major source of high-frequency noise. Unlike the mechanical CBS system, the penetron had no moving parts, could be built at any size (which was difficult to do with the disk), and had no problems with flicker. It represented a major advance in display technology.

=== NTSC ===
It was not long after the introduction of CBS' system that a new system was introduced by RCA that eventually won out. Unlike CBS's field-sequential system, RCA directly encoded the color for every spot on the screen, a system known as "dot-sequential". The advantage to the RCA system was that the primary component of the signal was very similar to the B&W signal used on existing sets, which meant the millions of B&W televisions would be able to receive the new signal while newer colors sets could see these in either B&W or color if that additional signal was provided. This was a huge advantage over the CBS system, and a modified version was selected by the NTSC as the new color standard in 1953.

The major disadvantage was the difficulty in correctly focusing the beam on the correct color, a problem RCA solved with their shadow mask system. The shadow mask is a thin metal foil with small holes photo-etched into it, positioned so the holes lie directly above one triplet of colored phosphor dots. Three separate electron guns are individually focused on the mask, sweeping the screen as normal. When the beams pass over one of the holes, they travel through it, and since the guns are separated by a small distance from each other at the back of the tube, each beam has a slight angle as it travels through the hole. The phosphor dots are arranged on the screen such that the beams hit only their correct phosphor. To ensure the holes line up with the dots, the mask is used to create the dots using photosensitive material.

The new broadcast system presented a serious problem for the penetron. The signal required the color to be selected at high speeds "on the fly" as the beam was being drawn across the screen. This meant the high voltage color selection grid had to be rapidly cycled, which presented numerous problems, notably high-frequency noise that filled the interior of the tube and interfered with the receiver electronics. Another modification was introduced to address this issue, using three separate guns, each fed with a different base voltage tuned to hit one of the layers. In this version no switching was required, eliminating the high-frequency noise.

Producing such a system proved difficult in practice, and for home television use GE instead introduced their "Porta-Color" system, a dramatic improvement on RCA's shadow mask system. Other developers continued working with the basic system attempting to find ways of solving the high frequency switching issues, but none of these entered commercial production.

=== Use in avionics ===
Despite its limitations, the penetron retained certain advantages in specialized applications. Although it was not well suited to the dot-sequential method of color broadcasting, this drawback was only relevant for over-the-air television reception. In contexts where the signal could be generated in any required format—such as computer displays—the penetron remained useful. When reproduction of a full color gamut was unnecessary, the relative simplicity of the technology further enhanced its appeal. These characteristics made the penetron particularly suitable for customized applications, including military avionics, where the format of the input signal was not critical and designers were free to employ any signaling method.

In the avionics role the penetron had other advantages as well. Its use of phosphors in layers instead of stripes meant that it had higher resolution, three times that of the RCA system. This was very useful for radar display and IFF systems, where the images were often overlaid with textual cues that required high resolution to be easily readable. Additionally, since all of the signal reached the screen in a penetron, as opposed to 15% of it in a shadow mask tube, for any given amount of power the penetron was much brighter. This was a major advantage in the avionics role where power budgets were often quite limited, yet the displays were often hit with direct sunlight and needed to be very bright. The lack of the shadow mask also meant the penetron was much more robust mechanically, and didn't suffer from color shifting under g-loads.

Penetrons were used from the late 1960s to the mid-1980s, mostly for radar or IFF systems where two-color displays (green/red/yellow) were commonly used. Improvements in conventional shadow masks removed most of its advantages during this period. Better focusing allowed the size of the holes in the shadow mask to increase in proportion to the opaque area, which improved display brightness. Brightness was further improved with the introduction of newer phosphors. Problems with doming were addressed through the use of invar shadow masks that were mechanically robust and attached to the tube using a strong metal frame.

=== Other uses ===
Penetron displays were also offered as an option on some graphics terminals, where the high speed color-switching was not required and the penetron's limited gamut was not a concern. IDI offered such displays as an $8,000 option on their IDIgraph and IDIIOM series terminals.

Tektronix, a major manufacturer of oscilloscopes, offered a limited gamut of color in some of its CRT oscilloscopes, using Penetron-type technology.

== Description ==
In most versions of the penetron the tube has an inner layer of red and outer layer of green, separated by a thin dielectric layer. A complete image is produced by scanning twice, once with the gun set to a lower power that is stopped in the red layer, and then again at a higher power that travels through the red layer and into the green. Yellow can be produced by hitting the same location on both sweeps.

In a display where the colors are either on or off and various brightness levels do not have to be created, the system can be further simplified by removing the color selection grid and modulating the voltage of the electron gun itself. However, this also causes problems because the electrons will reach the screen faster when accelerated with higher voltages, which means that the deflection system has to be increased in power as well to ensure the scanning creates the same screen size and line widths on both passes.

Several alternative arrangements of the penetron were experimented on to address this problem. One common attempt used an electron multiplier at the tube face instead of the selection grid. In this system a low-energy scanning beam was used, and magnets were set to cause the electrons to strike the sides of the multipliers. A shower of higher-energy electrons would then be released and travel to the layered phosphors of a normal penetron arrangement. It was later noticed that the beams emanating from the multipliers landed in rings, which allowed a new arrangement of phosphors in concentric rings instead of layers.

The main advantage to the penetron is that it lacks the mechanical focusing system of a shadow mask television, which means that all of the beam energy reaches the screen. For any given amount of power, the penetron will be much brighter, typically 85% brighter. This is a major advantage in an aircraft setting, where power supply is limited but the displays need to be bright enough to be easily read even when directly lit by sunlight. The system is guaranteed to produce the correct colors in spite of external interference or the g-forces of maneuvering – a very important quality in aviation settings. The penetron also offered higher resolutions because the phosphor was continuous, as opposed to the small spots in a shadow mask system. Additionally, the lack of the shadow mask makes the penetron much more robust mechanically.

Sinclair experimented with a variant of this technology on his early pocket TV screens, but was unable to produce an RGB version. Examples of these tubes exist as prototypes.

== See also ==
- Beam-index tube
- Chromatron
