= Geer tube =

The Geer tube was an early single-tube color television cathode ray tube, developed by American inventor Willard Geer. The Geer tube used a pattern of small phosphor-covered three-sided pyramids on the inside of the CRT faceplate to mix separate red, green, and blue signals from three electron guns. The Geer tube had a number of disadvantages and was never used commercially due to superior images generated by RCA's shadow mask system. Nevertheless, Geer's patent was awarded first, and RCA purchased an option on it in case their own developments did not become viable.

== History ==
=== Color television ===
Color television had been studied even before commercial broadcasting became common, but it was only in the late 1940s that the problem was seriously considered. At the time, a number of systems were being proposed that used separate red, green, and blue signals (RGB), broadcast in succession. Most experimental systems broadcast entire frames in sequence, with a colored filter (or "gel") that rotated in front of an otherwise conventional black and white television tube. Each frame encoded one color of the picture, and the wheel spun in sync with the signal so the correct gel was in front of the screen when that colored frame was being displayed. Because they broadcast separate signals for the different colors, all of these systems were incompatible with existing black-and-white sets. Another problem was that the mechanical filter made them flicker unless very high refresh rates were used.

RCA worked along different lines entirely, using a luminance-chrominance system. This system did not directly encode or transmit the RGB signals; instead, it combined these colors into one overall brightness figure, the "luminance". Luminance closely matched the black-and-white signal of existing broadcasts, allowing it to be displayed on black-and-white televisions. This was a major advantage over the mechanical systems being proposed by other groups. Color information was then separately encoded and folded into the signal as a high-frequency modification to produce a composite video signal – on a black and white television, this extra information would be seen as a slight randomization of the image intensity, but the limited resolution of existing sets made this invisible in practice. On color sets, the signal would be filtered out and added to the luminance to re-create the original RGB for display.

Although RCA's system had enormous benefits, it had not been successfully developed because it was difficult to produce the display tubes. Black and white TVs used a continuous signal, and the tube could be coated with an even deposit of phosphor. With the luminance concept, the color was changing continually along the line, which was far too fast for any sort of mechanical filter to follow. Instead, the phosphor had to be broken down into a discrete pattern of colored spots. Focusing the right signal on each of these tiny spots was beyond the capability of the electron guns of the era.

=== Geer's solution ===
Charles Willard Geer, then an assistant professor at the University of Southern California, was lecturing on the mechanical methods of producing color television that was being experimented with in the 1940s and decided that an electronically scanned system would be superior if someone would only invent one. Mentioning it later to his wife, she replied, "You'd better get busy and invent it yourself".

Geer solved the display problem with the novel application of optics. Instead of trying to focus the electron beams onto tiny spots, he instead focused them onto larger areas and used simple optics to re-combine each individual primary color at any given place on the screen into a single pixel. The tube was arranged with three separate electron guns, one each for red, green, and blue (RGB), arranged around the outside of the picture area. This made a Geer tube quite large; the "necks" of the tubes normally lie behind the display area and give the TV its depth, whereas in the Geer tube, the necks projected around the outside of the display area, making it much larger.

The rear face of the screen was covered with a series of tiny triangular pyramids imprinted on an aluminum sheet, coated on the inside of each face with colored phosphor. Properly aligned, a given electron beam could only reach one face of the pyramids, striking it and traveling through the thin metal into the thicker phosphor layer inside. When all three guns hit their respective faces, the colored light was created in the interior of the pyramid where it mixed, producing a proper color display on the open base, which faced the user.

One enormous advantage of the Geer system is that it could be used with any of the proposed color television broadcasting systems. CBS was promoting a "field sequential" system at 144 frames per second that they intended to display with a mechanical color filter wheel. This same signal could be displayed on a Geer tube by sending each successive frame to a different gun, in turn. RCA's "dot sequential" system could also be shown by de-multiplexing the signals and sending all three color signals to each of the appropriate guns at the same time. B&W signals could be displayed by sending the same signal, muted by 1/3, and also to all three guns at the same time.

Getting the electron beam to hit the correct pyramid, and not the surrounding ones, was a major problem for the design. The beam from an electron gun is normally circular, so when it was aimed at a triangular target, some part of the beam normally went past the target pyramid and hit others on the screen. This results in overscan, causing the image to be blurry and washed out. The problem was particularly difficult to solve because the angle between the beam and faces changed as the beams scanned the tube – pyramids near the gun would be hit at close to a right angle, but ones at the opposite side of the tube were at an acute angle. Considering that each gun was offset from the CRT's main axis, it was necessary to make major geometrical corrections to the raster geometry during the scan.

=== Competing systems ===
Geer filed for a patent on his design on July 11, 1944. Technicolor purchased the patent rights and started development of prototype units in concert with the Stanford Research Institute, spending a reported $500,000 in 1950 (approx. equivalent, $6,590,684.65 in 2025) on development. The system was widely reported on at the time, including mentions in Time, Popular Science, Popular Mechanics, Radio Electronics, and others.

Many other companies were also working on color television systems, most notably RCA. They had filed a patent on their shadow mask system only a few weeks after Geer. When Geer, and Technicolor, informed RCA of their patent, RCA took out licenses and added further funding to the project as a "second iron in the fire" in case none of their in-house developments worked out.

In head-to-head testing against other color television systems for the NTSC color standardization efforts that started in November 1949, Geer's tube did not fare particularly well. Overscan bled the colors into neighboring pixels and led to soft colors and poor color registration and contrast. This problem was by no means limited to the Geer tube; several different technologies were demonstrated at the show, and only the CBS mechanical system proved able to produce a picture that satisfied the judges. In 1950, the CBS system was adopted as the NTSC standard.

Geer continued to work on the overscan problems throughout the late 1940s and into the 1950s, filing additional patents on various corrections to improve the system. Other vendors were making similar strides with their own technologies, and in 1953 the NTSC reconvened a panel to consider the color issue. This time RCA's shadow mask system quickly demonstrated itself as superior to all the other systems, including Geer's. The shadow mask remained the primary method of building color televisions, with Sony Trinitron a distant second, until the early 2000s when LCD technology replaced CRTs. At the same time, RCA's version of color encoding into a signal that was compatible with existing B&W sets was also adopted, with modifications, and remained the primary U.S. television standard until 2009, when analog television was shut down.

=== After NTSC ===
Geer continued to work on his basic concept for some time, as well as other television-related concepts. In 1955 he filed a patent on a flat TV tube that used a gun arranged to lie beside the image area that fired upward toward the top. The beam was deflected through 90 degrees by a series of charged wires so the beam was now traveling horizontally across the back of the picture area. A second grid, located beside the first, then bent the beams through a small angle so they hit the back of the screen.

It does not appear that this device was ever constructed, and the arrangement of aiming elements suggests focusing the image would be a serious problem. Two other inventors had been working on this problem as well, Dennis Gabor in England (better known for the development of holograms) and William Aiken in the US. Both of their patents were filed before Geer's, and the Aiken tube was successfully built in small numbers. More recently, similar concepts were used, combined with computer-controlled convergence systems, to produce "flatter" systems, typically for computer monitor use. Sony sold small-screen monochrome TVs using basically-similar nearly-flat CRTs; they were used for outside-broadcast monitors, as well. However, these were quickly displaced by LCD-based systems.

In 1960 he filed for a patent on a three-dimensional television system that used two color tubes and a 2-dimensional version of his pyramids. The vertical channels reflected the light in two directions, providing different images for each eye.

=== Patents ===
- U.S. Patent 2,480,848, "Color Television Device", Charles Willard Geer/Technicolor Motion Picture Corporation, filed July 11, 1944, issued September 6, 1949
- U.S. Patent 2,622,220, "Television Color Screen", Charles Willard Geer/Technicolor Motion Picture Corporation, filed March 22, 1949, issued December 16, 1952
- U.S. Patent 2,850,669, "Television Picture Tube or the Like", Charles Willard Geer, filed April 26, 1955, issued September 2, 1958
- U.S. Patent 3,184,630, "Three-Dimensional Display Apparatus", Charles Willard Geer, filed July 12, 1960, issued May 18, 1960

== See also ==
- Chromatron, another early color television CRT that is no longer used
- Beam-index tube
- Shadow mask
- Aperture grille
