= Chromatron =

Color television cathode ray tube design

The Chromatron is a color television cathode ray tube design invented by Nobel prize-winner Ernest Lawrence and developed commercially by Paramount Pictures, Sony, Litton Industries and others. The Chromatron offered brighter images than conventional color television systems using a shadow mask, but a host of development problems kept it from being widely used in spite of years of development. Sony eventually abandoned it in favor of their famous Trinitron system using an aperture grille.

== History ==
=== Color television ===
Color television had been studied even before commercial broadcasting became common, but it was only in the late 1940s that the problem was seriously considered. At the time, a number of systems were being proposed that used separate red, green and blue signals (RGB), broadcast in succession. Most systems broadcast entire frames in sequence, with a colored filter (or "Color gel") that rotated in front of an otherwise conventional black and white television tube. Because they broadcast separate signals for the different colors, all of these systems were incompatible with existing black and white sets. Another problem was that the mechanical filter made them flicker unless very high refresh rates were used. In spite of these problems, the US Federal Communications Commission (FCC) selected a sequential-frame 144 frame/s standard from CBS as their color broadcast standard in 1950.

RCA worked along different lines entirely, using the luminance-chrominance system. This system did not directly encode or transmit the RGB signals; instead, it combined these colors into one overall brightness figure, the "luminance". Luminance closely matched the black and white signal of existing broadcasts, allowing it to be displayed on existing televisions. This was a major advantage over the mechanical systems being proposed by other groups. Color information was then separately encoded and folded into the signal as a high-frequency modification to produce a composite video signal – on a black and white television this extra information would be seen as a slight randomization of the image intensity and just appear blurry, but the limited resolution of existing sets made this invisible in practice. On color sets, the signal would be extracted, decoded back into RGB, and displayed.

Although RCA's system had enormous benefits, it had not been successfully developed because it was difficult to produce suitable display tubes. Black and white TVs used a continuous signal and the tube could be coated with an even painting of phosphor. With RCA's system, the color was changing continually along the line, which was far too fast for any sort of mechanical filter to follow. Instead, the phosphor had to be broken down into a discrete pattern of colored spots. Focusing the right signal on each of these tiny spots was beyond the capability of electron guns of the era. RCA's early experiments used three-tube projectors, or mirror-based systems known as "Triniscope".

=== Shadow masks ===
RCA eventually solved the problem of displaying the color images with their introduction of the shadow mask. The shadow mask consists of a thin sheet of aluminum with tiny holes photo etched into it, placed just behind the front surface of the picture tube. Three guns, arranged in a triangle, were all aimed at the holes. Stray electrons at the edge of the beam were cut off by the mask, creating a sharply focused spot that was small enough to hit a single colored phosphor on the screen. Since each of the guns aimed at the hole from a slightly different angle, the spots of phosphor on the tube could be separated slightly to prevent overlap.

The disadvantage of this approach was that for any given amount of gun power, the shadow mask filtered out the majority of the signal. To ensure there was no overlap of the signal on the screen, the dots had to be separated and covered perhaps 25% of its surface. This led to very dim images, requiring much greater power in order to provide a useful picture. Moreover, the system was highly dependent on the relative angles of the beams between the three guns, which required constant adjustment by the user to ensure the guns hit the correct colors. In spite of this, the technical superiority of the RCA system was overwhelming compared to the CBS system, and was selected as the new NTSC standard in 1953. The first broadcast using the new standard occurred on New Year's Day in 1954, when NBC broadcast the Tournament of Roses Parade.

In spite of this early start, only a few years after regularly scheduled television broadcasting had begun, consumer uptake of color televisions was very slow to start. The dim images, constant adjustments and high costs had kept them in a niche of their own. Low consumer acceptance led to a lack of color programming, further reducing the demand for the sets in a chicken or the egg situation. In the United States in 1960, only 1 color set was sold for every 50 sets sold in total.

=== Chromatron ===
In 1951, Ernest Lawrence, a 1939 Nobel Prize winner and professor at University of California, Berkeley best known as the father of the cyclotron, patented a new solution to the color decoding problem. This system, the "Chromatron" or simply "Lawrence Tube", used an electronic focusing system in place of RCA's mechanical solution. One of the Chromatron's technologies, the 1957 patent for target structure for the display tubes, was invented by Edwin McMillan, a 1951 Nobel Prize winner and fellow researcher/administrator with Ernest Lawrence at the Berkeley Radiation Lab.

The system consisted of a series of thin metal wires or plates placed about 1/2-inch behind the phosphor screen. The wires were used to electrically focus the beams and bend them onto the correct phosphors, which were arranged in vertical stripes. The phosphor covered over 50% of the screen's area, whereas the contemporary shadow masks covered about 25%. This led to much brighter images using the same amount of power.

Each focusing element consisted of a pair of wires, and a conductive aluminum coating on the back of the phosphors. The screen was normally charged with a potential of 3000 to 4500 V between the wires and the aluminum, resulting in a curved electric field between the grid and the screen. When the electron beam from the gun entered the region between the grid and the screen it was accelerated and focused down to a tiny spot, normally impinging on the green phosphor. By varying the relative voltage between the two wires in each pair, the beam would be bent one direction or the other, allowing control over the color. Unlike a shadow mask, all of the signal eventually reached the screen, further reducing power requirements.

If the chrominance signal was missing, or deliberately ignored, the focusing system was disconnected and its power added to the gun. This produced a slightly stronger and unfocused beam, which hit all three colored strips and produced a B&W image. The spaces between the stripes meant the overall image would be about as bright as a conventional B&W set. A shadow mask set required all three guns to be powered to produce a B&W image, and since the color spots were small, their power had to be very high.

Yet another advantage of the near-screen focusing was that the electron beam was bent to hit the phosphors on the tube's faceplate at right angles no matter what the angle of the beam was behind the focuser. This allowed the tubes to be built with much higher deflection angles than conventional tubes – 72 degrees as opposed to a more typical 45. Chromatron tubes thus had much less depth for any given horizontal size.

The Chromatron also had several disadvantages. One was that there was a fundamental ratio between the acceleration provided by the grid and the electron gun at the back of the tube; in order to ensure that the grid could successfully control the beam, it had to have a significant proportion of the overall power. Unfortunately the mechanical layout of the grid limited it to voltages of about 5000 V or less, which in turn limited the electron gun to relatively low voltages around 8000 V. Thus the overall power in the Chromatron was less than in conventional tubes, offsetting its natural brightness to some degree.

The more pressing concern was the mechanical layout of the grid. Getting the fine wires to stay aligned with the strips of color on the screen proved to be the design's Achilles heel.

=== Commercial developments ===
The University of California, Berkeley set up "Chromatic Television Laboratories" to commercially develop the system, in partnership with Paramount Pictures who provided development funding. They started producing the PDF 22-4 22-inch prototype tubes in 1952 and 1953, with a display area of 14 by 11 inches.

In practice the design proved to have serious problems. Since the focusing system had to quickly move the beam to generate the correct colors, very high voltages and powers had to be used, leading to arcing problems and radio frequency (RF) noise. Around 50 watts of RF power had to be applied to the wires to deflect the electron beam, directing it to the right colored stripe. The latter was particularly annoying when used as the basis of a television, as the noise interfered with the radio receivers that picked up the broadcasts. The university eventually abandoned their interest in Chromatron, but Paramount continued development as a system for displaying film during editing, which meant that the RF noise did not present a problem. Development was still continuing in the early 1960s when their work was bought by Sony.

In spite of these problems, the promise of the Chromatron system was so great that a number of companies continued development of the system throughout the 1950s. The radiation problem was solved by placing the wires further back from the phosphor stripes which reduced the capacitance and significantly reduced the driving power requirements. Later the wire diameters were reduced to accommodate the increased phosphor pitch. In addition, the output of the three video amplifiers switched the color information to hit each RGB stripe at the precise moments required. In other words, a keyed operation of the three color stages. Later, the General Colornetron adopted this approach. Successor Chromatron tubes experimented with different color phosphors to obtain the correct combination of brightness and persistence. Finally a rather large copper box or cage was mounted externally to the bell to reduce the remaining radiation from the grid coil. No interference was observed and the pictures produced were described as fairly decent and viewable with no visible streaking or striping. The Chromatron design was also licensed for a variety of other uses; Litton Industries used the Chromatron with a two-color display (blue-red) as the basis for an Identification Friend or Foe system.

=== Sony's attempt ===
By 1961, Sony was a major Japanese manufacturer of black and white sets, but had no color television technology at all. Sony dealers were asking when they could expect a color set, and the sales division started putting pressure on engineering to simply license a shadow mask design from another maker and start production. Masaru Ibuka refused, apparently displaying an intense personal feeling that the shadow mask design was fundamentally flawed.

In March 1961, Ibuka, Akio Morita and Nobutoshi Kihara attended the IEEE trade show at the New York Coliseum. This was Kihara's first visit to the U.S., and he spent considerable time wandering the show floor. At the small Autometric booth he saw the Chromatron being displayed, and hurried to find Morita and Ibuka to show them. When Morita saw the display he immediately started negotiating a meeting for the next morning to visit the Chromatic labs in Manhattan. By the end of the meeting the next day, Morita had secured a license to produce "a Chromatron tube and color television receiver utilizing it."

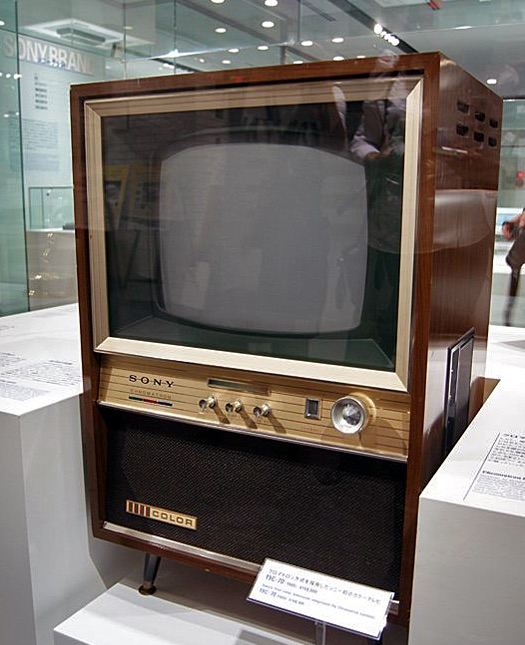
Sony Chromatron

In early 1963, Senri Miyaoka was sent to the Chromatic labs to arrange the transfer of the technology to Sony, which would lead to the closing of Chromatic. He was unimpressed with the labs, describing the windowless basement as "squalor". The American team was quick to point out the flaws in the Chromatron design, telling Miyaoka that the design was hopeless. By September 1964, a 17 inch prototype had been built in Japan, but mass-production test runs were demonstrating serious problems.

Ibuka remained a staunch supporter of the technology and pressed ahead with the construction of a new factory to produce them near Ōsaki Station in Tokyo. This proved unwise; in early runs only 1 to 3 tubes would be usable out of every 1,000 produced. The rest suffered from alignment problems, with the colors fading from one to another across the screen, impossible to fix after the tube was sealed. Usable tubes were quickly rushed to Sony showrooms in spite of the low yields, and Ibuka make the product Sony's top sales priority. This too proved unwise; the low yields meant that the production cost was about 400,000 yen, but Sony was forced to sell them at 198,000 yen ($500) in order to be competitive.

The production problems were never solved, and led to increasing tension between Ibuka and Morita. In November 1966 Kazuo Iwama told Susumu Yoshida that the company was close to ruin, and that the team had to improve the yields by the end of the year, or the product would have to be cancelled. Meanwhile, RCA was making great progress improving their shadow mask technology, and new entrants like General Electric's "Porta-Color" offered other advantages. Sony was clearly falling behind the rest of the market by following the Chromatron approach.

Ibuka finally announced that he would personally lead the search for an alternative system. His team of 30 engineers and physicists explored a wide variety of approaches in the search for a uniquely Sony system. After reading several of the reports, Ibuka called 29-year-old physicist Miyaoka into his office along with Yoshida, and asked him if his modified single-gun approach using three cathodes could be made to work. Miyaoka was attempting to leave work for a cello rehearsal, and rashly stated that it would work. The result was the famed Trinitron system, despite not being a true "one gun" CRT and despite being very similar to other color CRTs already on the market, went on sale in 1968 to wide acclaim.

=== Limited sales ===
Prior to sale of the first Trinitron televisions in the United States, a limited number of 7-inch Chromatrons were built and offered for sale in the United States starting in April 1968 as the KV 7010U. These were replaced about three months later by the KV 7010UA Trinitron tube.

The Sony KV 7010U CRT used the newly invented Trinitron gun combined with the Chromatron PDA wire grid instead of a shadow mask or aperture grill.

== Description ==
The basic concept that defined the Chromatron was the near-screen focusing system, which provided the beam resolution needed to accurately hit the individual colored phosphor strips. The grid both focused the signal as well as guided it to the correct colors.

The phosphors were silk screened onto the back of the tube in strips 2 mils wide with 2 mil wide gaps between them, and then coated in aluminum to make the screen conductive. Since the grid had to be charged to relatively high voltages, the aluminum coating was fairly thick, which dimmed the image to some extent.

The phosphors were patterned in an RGB-BGR-RGB pattern. The focusing grid was aligned so the beam would normally focus down onto the green strips in the middle of each pair of wires. To produce different colors, say blue, the beam would have to be pulled to the right for one pixel, and then to the left for the next. Since the adjacent stripes of phosphors shared one of the wires, this meant that a single voltage setting would produce the blue color on two adjacent pixels. Since a single frame of color television does not consist of a single color, the deflection system had to be continually varied as the beam moved across the screen.

== See also ==
- Geer tube, another early color television CRT that is no longer used
- Shadow mask
- Aperture grille
