= Werner Flechsig =

German physicist and television pioneer

Werner Flechsig (8 June 1900 - 12 October 1981) was a German physicist and television pioneer.

== Life ==
Werner Flechsig was born on 8 June 1900, in Cologne, Germany. He began studying mathematics and physics at the Technical University of Hanover. He continued his education at the Georg August University of Göttingen. There, Flechsig assisted Robert Wichard Pohl. In 1925, Flechsig completed his doctorate with the dissertation "Science of Photoelectric Primary Current in Crystals." In this document, Flechsig dealt with hot cathodes and photocells. He also considered the work of Pohl's assistant Bernhard Gudden.

Flechsig became an employee of Fernseh-AG in Berlin, where he developed TV camera tubes. In 1936, he made the orthicon technology practical. At the Olympic summer games, orthicon camera tubes supplanted the earlier iconoscope tubes.

In 1937, the Internationale Funkausstellung of the Reichspost Research Institute displayed a color television method. (The Internationale Funkausstellung is the International Radio Exposition.) The new color television method used two primary colors. The process failed to produce satisfactory pictures. Members of the organization discussed developing a more accurate method to produce a full-color display: Additive color mixing with three primary colors.

Flechsig invented the principle of color picture generation with shadow-mask picture tubes., He registered his shadow-mask process in July 1938 as a German Reichspatent. The patent title was "Cathode Ray Tube for the Development of Multicolored Pictures on a Fluorescent Screen." An exhibit at the 1939 Internationale Funkausstellung Berlin displayed a prototype of Flechsig's color television receiver.

The war put an end to the technical implementation of Flechsig's shadow mask picture tube. The Radio Corporation of America produced the first commercial realization in 1949.

Flechsig was an honorary member of the Television and Cinema Engineering Society. Werner Flechsig died on 12 October 1981, in Wolfenbüttel.

== Writings ==
- "Science of Photoelectric Primary Current in Crystals," 1926, dissertation.
- "About the Saturation of Photoelectric Primary Current in Crystals," 1928.
- "Cathode Ray Tube for Development of Multicolored Pictures on a Fluorescent Screen," 1938, Reichspatent 736,575.

== Bibliography ==
- History of Electronic Entertainment, David L. Morton, 1999.
- Physical Sheets 37, No. 5, 1981.
- Andreas Fickers: "Politics of Grandeur" versus "Made in Germany." Political Cultural History of Technology, Using the Example of the PAL-SECAM Controversy. Oldenbourg, Munich 2007, ISBN 978-3-486-58178-2.
