= Dot pitch =

Distance between RGB dots (sub-pixels) on a display

Some types of pixel layout showing how pixel pitch is measured

Dot pitch (sometimes called line pitch, stripe pitch, or phosphor pitch) is a specification for a computer display, computer printer, image scanner, or other pixel-based devices that describe the distance, for example, between dots (sub-pixels) on a display screen. In the case of an RGB color display, the derived unit of pixel pitch is a measure of the size of a triad plus the distance between triads.

Dot pitch may be measured in linear units (with smaller numbers meaning higher resolution), usually millimeters (mm), or as a rate, for example, dots per inch (with a larger number meaning higher resolution). Closer spacing produces a sharper image (as there are more dots in a given area). However, other factors may affect image quality, including:

- Undocumented or inadequately documented measurement method, complicated by ignorance of the existence of different methods
- Confusion of pixels and subpixels
- Element spacing varying across screen area (e.g., widening in corners compared to center)
- Differing pixel geometries
- Differing image and pixel aspect ratios
- Miscellanea such as Kell factor or interlaced video

The exact difference between horizontal and diagonal dot pitch varies with the design of the monitor (see pixel geometry and widescreen), but a typical entry-level 0.28 mm (diagonal) monitor has a horizontal pitch of 0.24 or 0.25 mm, and a good quality 0.26 mm (diagonal) unit has a horizontal pitch of 0.22 mm.

The above dot pitch measurement does not apply to aperture grille displays. Such monitors use continuous vertical phosphor bands on the screen, so the vertical distance between scan lines is limited only by the video input signal's vertical resolution and the thickness of the electron beam, so there is no vertical 'dot pitch' on such devices. Aperture grille only has horizontal 'dot pitch', or otherwise known as 'stripe pitch'.

== Common dot pitch sizes ==
Laptop and desktop LCDs
Display definition (—)	Area (Mpx)	Size (in)	Pitch (μm)	Resolution (ppi)
1024×768 (XGA)	0.78	15	297	85.5
1280×768 (WXGA)	0.98	15.4	262	96.9
1280×800 (WXGA)	1.01	15.4	259	98.0
1280×800 (WXGA)	1.01	17	286	88.8
1280×1024 (SXGA)	1.31	17	264	96.2
1280×1024 (SXGA)	1.31	18.1	280	90.7
1280×1024 (SXGA)	1.31	19	294	86.3
1440×900 (WXGA+)	1.29	15.4	230	110.4
1440×900 (WXGA+)	1.29	17	254	100.0
1440×900 (WXGA+)	1.29	19	285	89.1
1400×1050 (SXGA+)	1.51	15	214	118.6
1400×1050 (SXGA+)	1.51	20.1	292	87.0
1680×1050 (WSXGA+)	1.76	15.4	197	128.9
1680×1050 (WSXGA+)	1.76	17	218	116.5
1680×1050 (WSXGA+)	1.76	19	244	104.0
1680×1050 (WSXGA+)	1.76	20.1	258	98.4
1680×1050 (WSXGA+)	1.76	21	269	94.4
1680×1050 (WSXGA+)	1.76	22	282	90.0
1600×1200 (UXGA)	1.92	15	191	132.9
1600×1200 (UXGA)	1.92	20.1	255	99.6
1600×1200 (UXGA)	1.92	21.3	270	94.0
1920×1200 (WUXGA)	2.30	15.4	173	146.8
1920×1200 (WUXGA)	2.30	17	191	132.9
1920×1200 (WUXGA)	2.30	23	258	98.4
1920×1200 (WUXGA)	2.30	24	270	94.0
1920×1200 (WUXGA)	2.30	25.5	287	88.5
1920×1200 (WUXGA)	2.30	27	303	83.8
2560×1440 (WQHD)	3.68	27	233	108.8
2560×1440 (WQHD)	3.68	32	273	93.0
2560×1600 (WQXGA)	4.09	30	250	101.6
3840×2160 (UHD)	8.29	27	155	163.0
3840×2160 (UHD)	8.29	32	182	140.0
3840×2400 (WQUXGA)	9.21	22.2	125	203.2
