= Triad (monitors) =

Group of three phosphor dots used in computer monitors

In cathode-ray tube (CRT) terms, a triad is a group of 3 phosphor dots coloured red, green, and blue on the inside of the CRT display of a computer monitor or television set. By directing differing intensities of cathode rays onto the 3 phosphor dots, the triad will display a colour by combining the red, green and blue elements. However, triads are not pixels, and multiple triads will form one logical pixel of the displayed image.

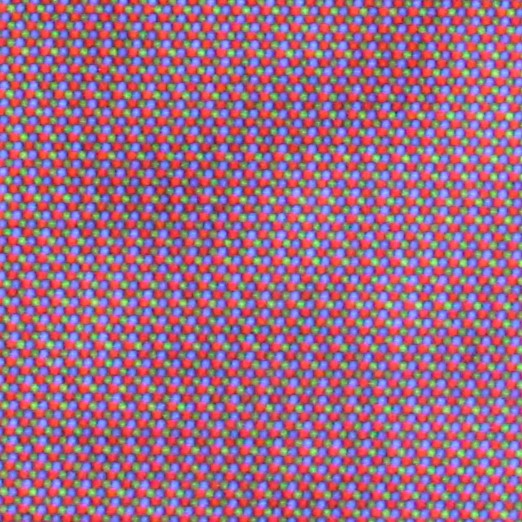
Triads from a CRT monitor, where you can see the red, green, and blue.

In liquid-crystal displays (LCDs), colours are similarly composed of these 3 fundamental colours.

== See also ==
- Aperture grille
- Pixel
- Shadow mask
- Subpixel rendering
