= Beam-index tube =

Type of color television

The beam-index tube is a color television cathode ray tube (CRT) design, using phosphor stripes and active-feedback timing, rather than phosphor dots and a beam-shadowing mask as developed by RCA. Beam indexing offered much brighter pictures than shadow-mask CRTs, reducing power consumption, and as they used a single electron gun rather than three, they were easier to build and required no alignment adjustments.

Philco led the development of the beam-indexing concept in a series of experimental devices they called the Apple tube. In spite of lengthy development, they were never able to manufacture a cost-competitive indexing tube, and eventually abandoned the concept. The major problem was the cost of the indexing electronics, which in later models required an expensive photomultiplier tube.

New detectors and transistor-based electronics led to the system being re-introduced as the Uniray in the 1970s. It was highly competitive in price terms, but competing against greatly improved shadow mask designs and the new Trinitron. Several Japanese companies used the Uniray for a variety of specialist purposes, the best-known being the Sony Indextron series. The system also saw some military use, due to its low sensitivity to magnetic interference, and in such use in the UK it was known as the Zebra tube.

== History ==
=== Early color CRTs ===
In conventional black-and-white (B&W) televisions, the CRT screen has a uniform coating of phosphor that emits white light when struck by electrons. The beam from an electron gun at the back of the tube is deflected (most commonly) by the varying fields from magnetic coils so it may be directed at any point on the screen. Electronic circuits known as time base generators pull the beam across the tube and down, creating the scanning pattern used in television signals. An amplitude-modulated signal is used to control the beam current, controlling the brightness as it is pulled across the screen.

Color televisions are based on using phosphors of the three additive primary colors (red, green and blue, RGB). In order to produce reasonable resolution similar to that of a black-and-white set, the phosphors have to be deposited in very small dots or stripes. An electron gun at the back of the tube cannot be focused tightly enough to hit only a single phosphor color if that phosphor is as small as desired. Some secondary system needs to be used to refocus the beam.

RCA ultimately solved this problem with a shadow mask. In this system, three separate electron guns are each aimed from different directions at a spot just behind the screen. There, a metal plate with very small holes is used to refocus the beam. Because the beams hit the plate at different incoming angles, they separate again on the far side of the plate, hitting the individual dots of color phosphor. The downside to this approach is that the plate also cuts off the majority of the beam, as much as 85% of it, leading to low image brightness. It also required three electron guns, driving up the price of the tube, and keeping the guns in proper alignment with the mask was a constant problem.

A number of solutions were attempted that used a single electron gun and some sort of electrical or magnetic field very close to the screen to provide the same result as the shadow mask. RCA worked on a system with charged wires that pulled the beams slightly toward them, with stripes of colored phosphors beyond them. The problem was that the wires had to be placed very close to each other to provide the required resolution, while also being powered with high voltages to provide enough deflection. This made it very difficult to keep the signals from leaking from wire to wire. Development was abandoned when the shadow mask proved successful.

Ernest Lawrence developed a similar system known as Chromatron, which used a grid of fine wires behind the screen to electrically deflect the beam, but it suffered from the same basic problem as RCA's approach. In spite of years of development, no one was able to produce a commercially viable version. Sony's attempt to produce a practical Chromatron inspired the development of their Trinitron system.

=== Apple tube ===
Single-gun systems like the Chromatron create color by rapidly varying the intensity of the beam to adjust the brightness for each color component and then using a second system to ensure that the instantaneous signal ends up on the correct phosphor. The beam-index tube uses an alternate solution which allows the beam to scan normally, as in a black-and-white television, with no secondary focussing system, and instead rapidly varies the intensity of the beam when it knows it is over the correct color. To do this, the tube requires some way to accurately time the beam's passage along the tube, with enough accuracy to ensure the proper color is hit.

Philco's approach to the problem of properly indexing the beam in relation to the phosphors relied on the process of secondary emission, where high-speed electrons entrain electrons from surrounding material, creating a pulse of additional current. Unlike the shadow mask, where small dots of phosphor are used, the apple tube used vertical stripes of color patterned across the tube. The most basic indexing concept uses a fourth stripe of phosphor between adjacent RGB stripes that gives off light that cannot be seen by the eye, but can be seen by electronics within the television.

Several different arrangements of components, materials and electronics were used while researching this approach during a ten-year development period, during most of which time it was kept secret. The most common system, first publicly demonstrated in 1956, used stripes of magnesium oxide deposited on the back of aluminum as the indexing system. In order to ensure the electronics had enough time to respond to the indexing signal and adjust the color, a separate "pilot beam" was generated from the gun and positioned to lead the main "writing beam" by a small distance within the tube. When the indexing beam hit the magnesium oxide, a shower of electrons was given off, which were collected by a conductive coating of carbon deposited on the inside of the tube. The low-power pilot beam had just enough power to dimly light the tube to a just-visible even background intensity.

Since both the pilot and writing beams hit the index stripes, two signals would be generated as the beams swept across the tube. In order to distinguish between them, the pilot beam was modulated with a varying signal timed so that it was at maximum power only when it would be in the approximate location of the index stripes. The frequency of the modulating signal was a function of the tube geometry; on a 21-inch (530 mm) tube the index stripes were positioned 0.51 in (13 mm) apart, a single horizontal sweep takes about 53 microseconds, so the signal had to be modulated at 7.4 MHz.

The original modulating signal was then compared with the amplified return signal from the secondary emission process, producing a net output that varied in phase by the difference in position between the estimated and real position of the beam. This phase signal was then sent into the conventional color decoder, adjusting the chroma on the fly. The writing beam, positioned to sweep the spaces between the indexes while the pilot beam was on them, received the chroma signal so that its power was modulated to produce the correct amounts of color when it was on top of those stripes. By the time it reached the index stripe, the pilot's modulating signal would be at its minimum, and the strong signal given off by the writing beam would simply be ignored.

In order to ensure the positioning of the pilot and writing beams remained as constant as possible, the apple tube used a unique electron gun arrangement. The beams were produced from a single anode and two closely spaced cathodes, resulting in the beams traveling in slightly different directions. They were then magnetically focused so they crossed at a point just in front of the electron guns, where a single-slit aperture was used to clear up the signal to produce a sharp-edged elliptical beam pattern. The deflection coils were positioned around the aperture, so by having both beams pass by the deflection coils while superimposed, the deflection of both was equal. The beams then spread out again on the far side of the aperture, where a second focussing arrangement ensured both were traveling parallel to each other.

The electrons emitted from the index stripes had low energy, and thus traveled at low speed to the pickup point at a "button" on the rear of the tube. Since the travel time was a significant factor, the timing of the phase comparison had to be adjusted as the beam swept the face of the tube – at the sides of the tube the electrons were close to the tube pickup, but when the beams were in the middle of the tube, they had a longer distance to travel. Additional timing circuitry was needed to account for this.

Actually building the apple tube's electronics proved to be difficult. The fast response needed to adjust the color signal based on the index was difficult to build using the tube-based electronics of the era, and the system's electronics were much more expensive than conventional shadow-mask sets. Their demonstration unit had eight more tubes than a similar shadow-mask system, which at that time represented a significant cost. Additionally, the secondary emission did not provide a sharp signal, and crosstalk between the pilot and writing beams was always a problem.

=== Advanced Apple ===
Another solution to the indexing problem was introduced by David Goodman of New York University. He replaced the electron emitter of the Philco design with a new material that gave off x-rays. These were received by scintillators at the back of the tube, beside the guns. As the light speed was independent of power and essentially instant compared to the timing needed for the indexing, the new design allowed the elimination of the complex timing circuitry of the original design.

Given all of the problems that the apple tube was having, Philco engineers adopted the design as the "advanced apple" tube. Their version used a new material that gave off ultraviolet light in place of the x-rays and replaced the scintillators with a single photomultiplier tube. The flashes of light given off by the index stripes were amplified by the photomultiplier and then sent into the color decoder as normal. Delays in the timing circuitry itself were taken care of by slightly adjusting the position of the index stripes on the tube. This eliminated much of the circuitry associated with the index timing, and led to a lower-cost chassis.

However, it also introduced the photomultiplier, a complex tube of its own that was at that time still in its developmental infancy and relatively expensive. After some development the company was able to reliably produce advanced apple systems, but the cost of production was too high at about $75 per tube ($744 today) and tooling at $15 million ($158 million today) made the system unattractive.

Development of the system was also picked up by Sylvania and Thorn Electrical Industries in the UK, who published details on what they called the "Zebra tube" in 1961. They were apparently successful in their work, but as no color television standard effort was making headway in Britain at the time, no commercial versions were forthcoming from this development either.

=== Uniray ===
After Philco gave up on the apple system, the rights were purchased by one of the engineers, David Sunstein. After many years he re-introduced the advanced apple design as the Uniray. The introduction of low-cost photodiodes dramatically changed the complexity and cost equations of the advanced apple indexing system, and the introduction of all-in-one timing systems implemented as integrated circuits did the same on the chassis side of the system. What was once a useful but impractical device became cost effective by the early 1970s.

Sunstein produced a prototype Uniray system using an original Philco tube and new electronics, and started shopping the concept around in 1972. There was some effort to license the system to Japanese companies, most of whom had licensed the shadow mask from RCA and were facing stiff competition from Sony's newly introduced Trinitron system. Several companies started the development of Uniray-based televisions in the later 1970s, and several different products were introduced in the 1980s.

Since the beam indexing adjusted the beam position as the beam was scanning across the tube, external magnetic fields had little effect on the image. This made the system particularly useful for avionics displays where the systems were subject to heavy interference from surrounding equipment. Rockwell International received a patent in 1978 on this use. Ferranti in the UK also offered a 4-by-3-inch (102 by 76 mm) beam-index tube as the mapping display in the Panavia Tornado mid-life upgrade.

Hitachi started development of the advanced apple system for television use, but instead used it for much more limited applications. The only widespread use was in the color viewfinders of handheld video tape recorders, first introduced in 1983 in a 1 1/2 in (38 mm) form. The rejection of interference from the nearby rotating magnetic recording head made a color viewfinder practical. The single gun and brighter images for any given gun power levels also meant that the indexed display was much more power-efficient than conventional systems, allowing it to be used in battery-powered applications.

Sony also did some development with the Uniray concept, introducing a range of products under the "Indextron" trade name. Their first product was the FP-62 "Vidimagic" projection television system. The Indextron tube was so bright that it could directly project an enlarged image in a front projection television without the need for three separate tubes, eliminating convergence problems. A second version with built-in Betamax VCR was sold as the PF-60. A better-known application was the KVX-370, a 4-inch (100 mm) "bedside" television with a built-in alarm clock.

Sanyo used the bright images produced by the Index 1 30CTV1 from 1985 to make a new style of tube nicknamed the "lollipop". It used an electron gun arranged parallel to the display, extending down instead of to the rear. The color image was created by a single electron beam indexed across the 3-inch (76 mm) display, 42mm at its thickest point, the cabinet only 1.75 inches (44 mm) deep and 9 inches (230 mm) high. They demonstrated the system in a small television similar to the Sony Watchman (1982) in 1985 and brought it to market about 1986.

== Description ==
The optically indexed tube displayed images by lighting vertical stripes of colored phosphor arranged in a red-green-blue pattern. A single electron gun was used to excite the stripes, and the beam strength is modulated in order to produce different colors.

Each RGB pattern was followed by a single stripe of UV phosphor on the inside face of the tube, where the light was not visible to the viewer. Light given off by this stripe was captured by a photomultiplier tube or a photodiode on the outside of the tube that was positioned over a clear window in the tube surface. The signal from the photomultiplier was amplified and sent into the color decoder circuit.

The color decoder electrically subtracted the signal from the photomultiplier from the existing color burst signal. This resulted in a phase difference that advanced or retarded the modulation of the single beam. This way even if the beam was advancing too fast or too slow, the index system would adjust the timing on the fly to ensure proper colors were produced. In order to receive a signal strong enough to index with, the beam had to be left on at all times, which reduced contrast ratio in relation to conventional tubes, since some light still had to be emitted for the electron beam to be tracked by the photodiodes.

The beam-index tube bears some resemblance to two other types of television tubes which also used vertical stripes of colored phosphor instead of dots or grids. The Chromatron used two sets of fine wires suspended behind the display area to electrically focus its single beam, one set of wires pulling the beam towards the red side and the other towards the blue. The grids were aligned so the beam would normally focus onto the green stripe in the middle, but by varying the relative voltage between the two the beam could accurately hit the colored stripes. In practice the wires were difficult to keep aligned with the phosphors, and gave off electrical noise that interfered with the radio receivers in a television application. It saw some use in military settings, including some commercial television use in the Yaou, Sony 19C 70 and the Sony KV 7010U.

The other similar design is the Trinitron, which combined the vertical stripes of the beam-index and Chromatron tubes with a new single-gun three-beam cathode and an aperture grille instead of a shadow mask. The result was a design with the mechanical simplicity of the shadow mask design and the bright images of the beam-index system. Trinitron was a major product for Sony for several decades, representing the high-point of conventional color TV displays until the widespread introduction of plasma displays and LCD televisions in the 21st century.
