= Aperture grille =

Technology used in certain color CRTs

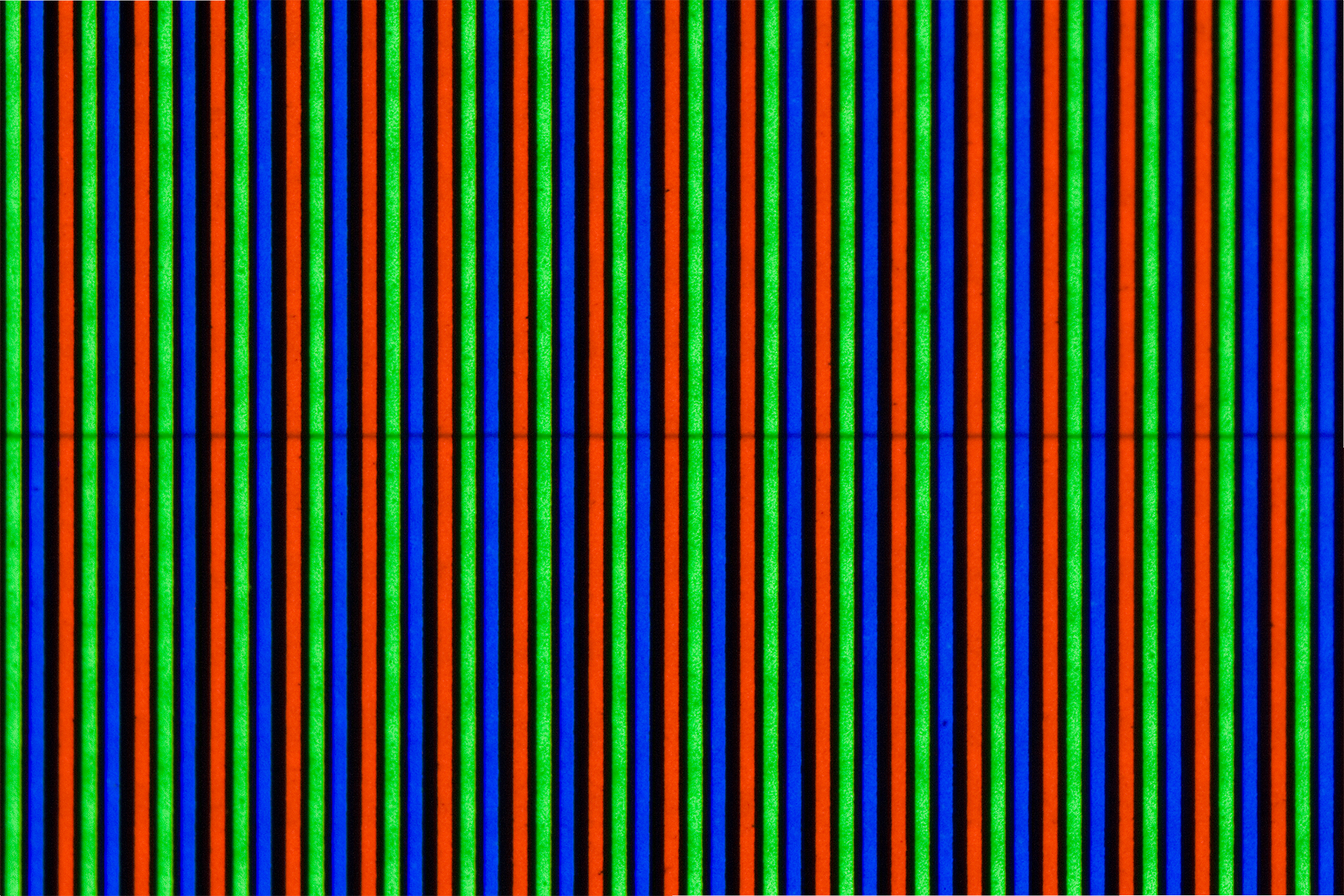
Aperture-grille-based CRT in close-up

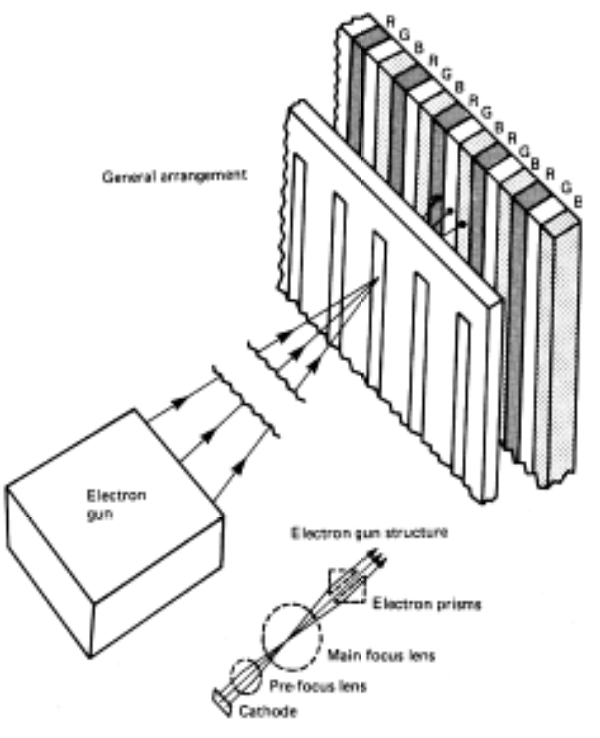
Labelled sketch showing the principle of the Trinitron picture tube

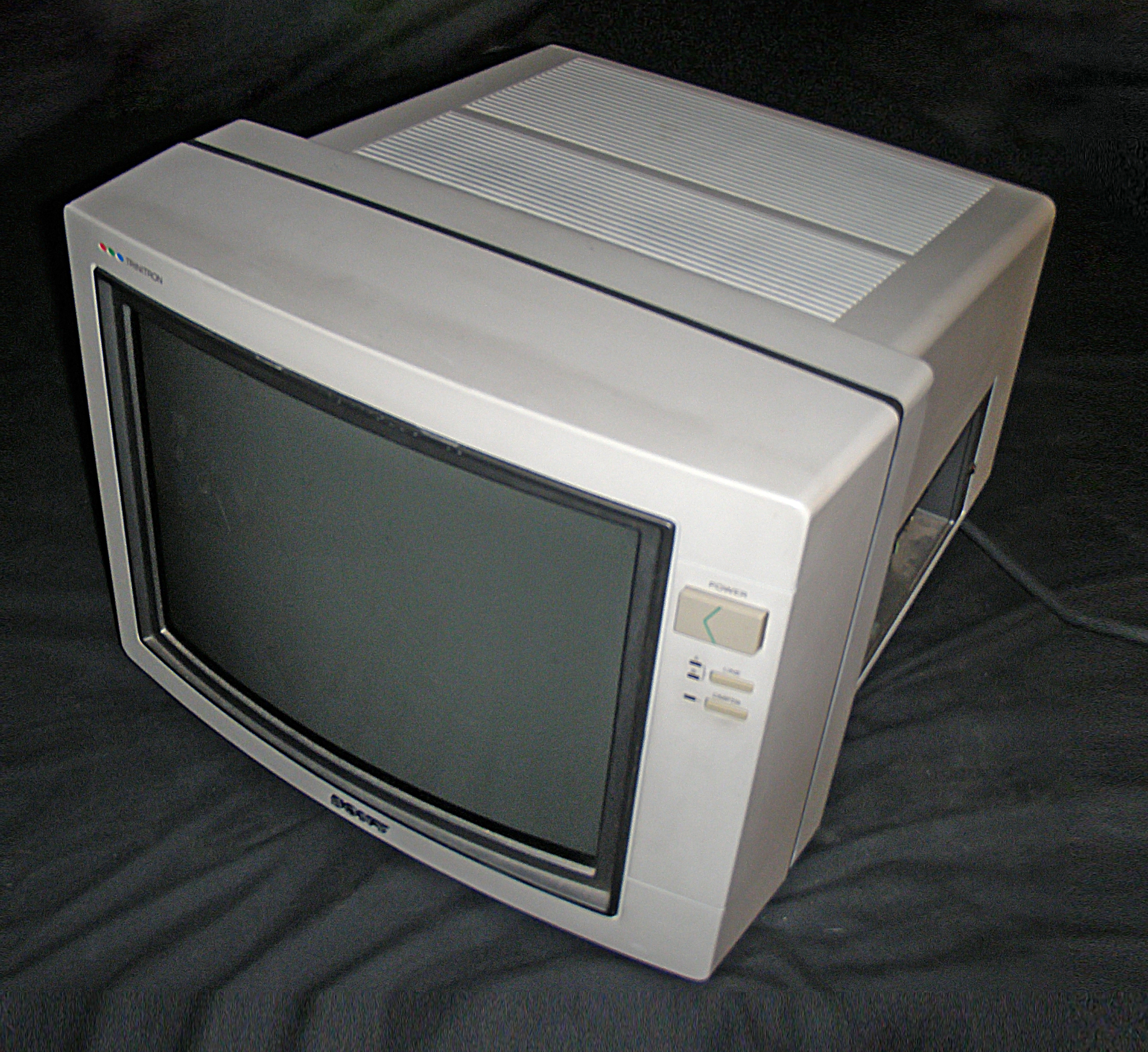
Sony Trinitron aperture grille monitor

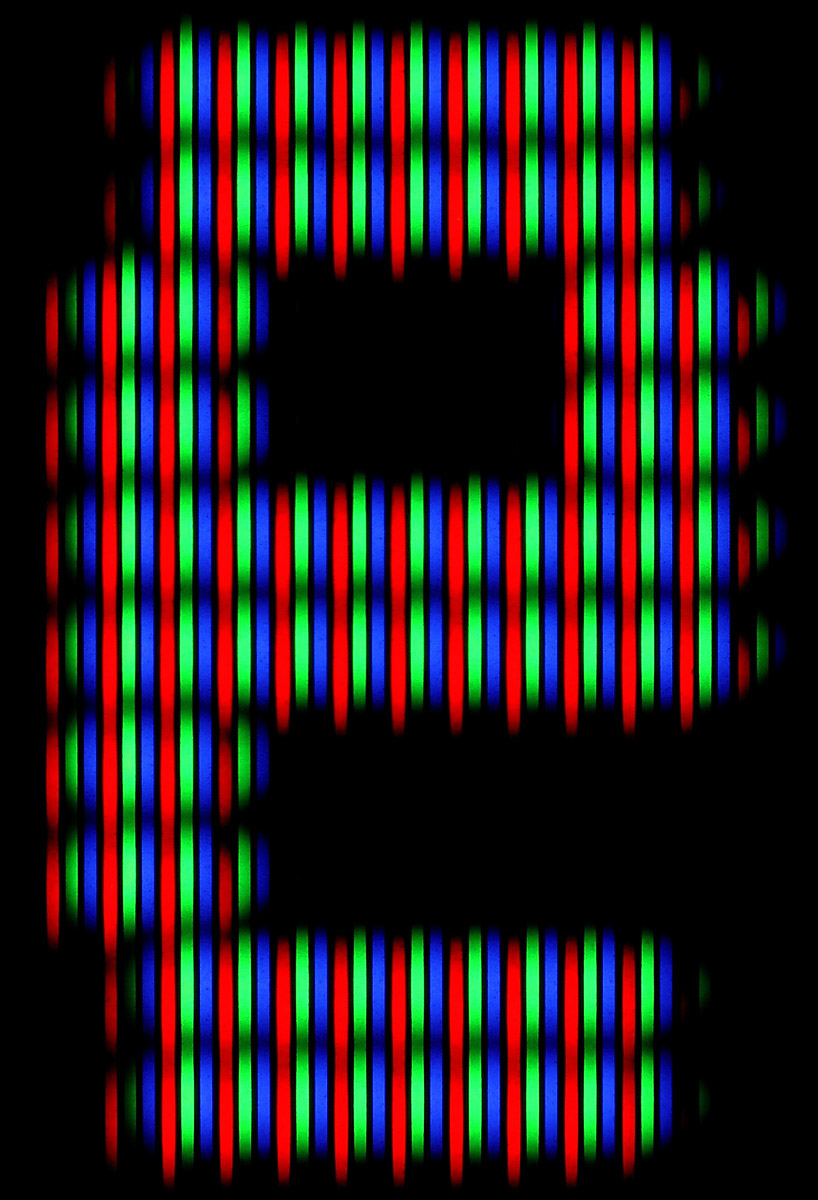
Aperture-grille-based CRT in close-up, showing the letter e from a teletext page

An aperture grille is one of two major technologies used to manufacture color cathode-ray tube (CRT) televisions and computer displays; the other is the shadow mask. The first patented aperture grille televisions were manufactured under the Trinitron brand name.

Fine vertical wires behind the front glass of the display screen separate the different colors of phosphors into strips. These wires are positioned such that an electron beam from one of three guns at the rear of the tube is only able to strike phosphors of the appropriate color. That is, the blue electron gun will strike blue phosphors, but will find a wire blocks the path to red and green phosphors.

The fine wires allow for a finer dot pitch as they can be spaced much closer together than the perforations of a shadow mask, and there need be no gap between adjacent horizontal pixels.

During the display of bright images, a shadow mask warms, and expands outward in all directions (sometimes called blooming). Aperture grilles do not exhibit this behavior; when the wires heat up, they expand vertically. Because there are no defined holes, this expansion does not affect the image, and the wires do not move horizontally.

The vertical wires of the aperture grille have a resonant frequency and will vibrate in sympathetic resonance with loud sounds near the display, resulting in fluttering and shimmering of colors on the display. To reduce these resonant effects, one or two horizontal stabilizing wires, called "damping wires", are welded across the grille wires, and may be visible as fine dark lines across the face of the screen. These stabilizing wires provide the easiest way to distinguish aperture grille and shadow mask displays at a glance. The stabilized grille can still vibrate but the sounds need to be loud and be emitted close to the display.

Additionally, aperture grille displays tend to be vertically flat and are often horizontally flat as well, while shadow mask displays usually have a spherical curvature.

The first patented aperture grille televisions were manufactured by Sony in the late 1960s under the Trinitron brand name, which the company carried over to its line of CRT computer monitors. Subsequent designs, whether licensed from Sony or manufactured after the patent's expiration, tend to use the -tron suffix, such as Mitsubishi's Diamondtron and ViewSonic's SonicTron.

Aperture grilles are not as mechanically stable as shadow or slot masks; a tap can cause the image to briefly become distorted, even with damping/support wires.

== See also ==
- Shadow mask
- Cromaclear
- Chromatron
- Trinitron
