= Electron gun =

Electrical component producing a narrow electron beam

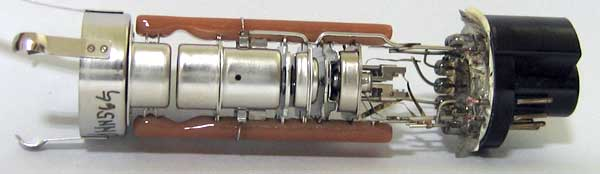
Electron gun from a cathode-ray tube

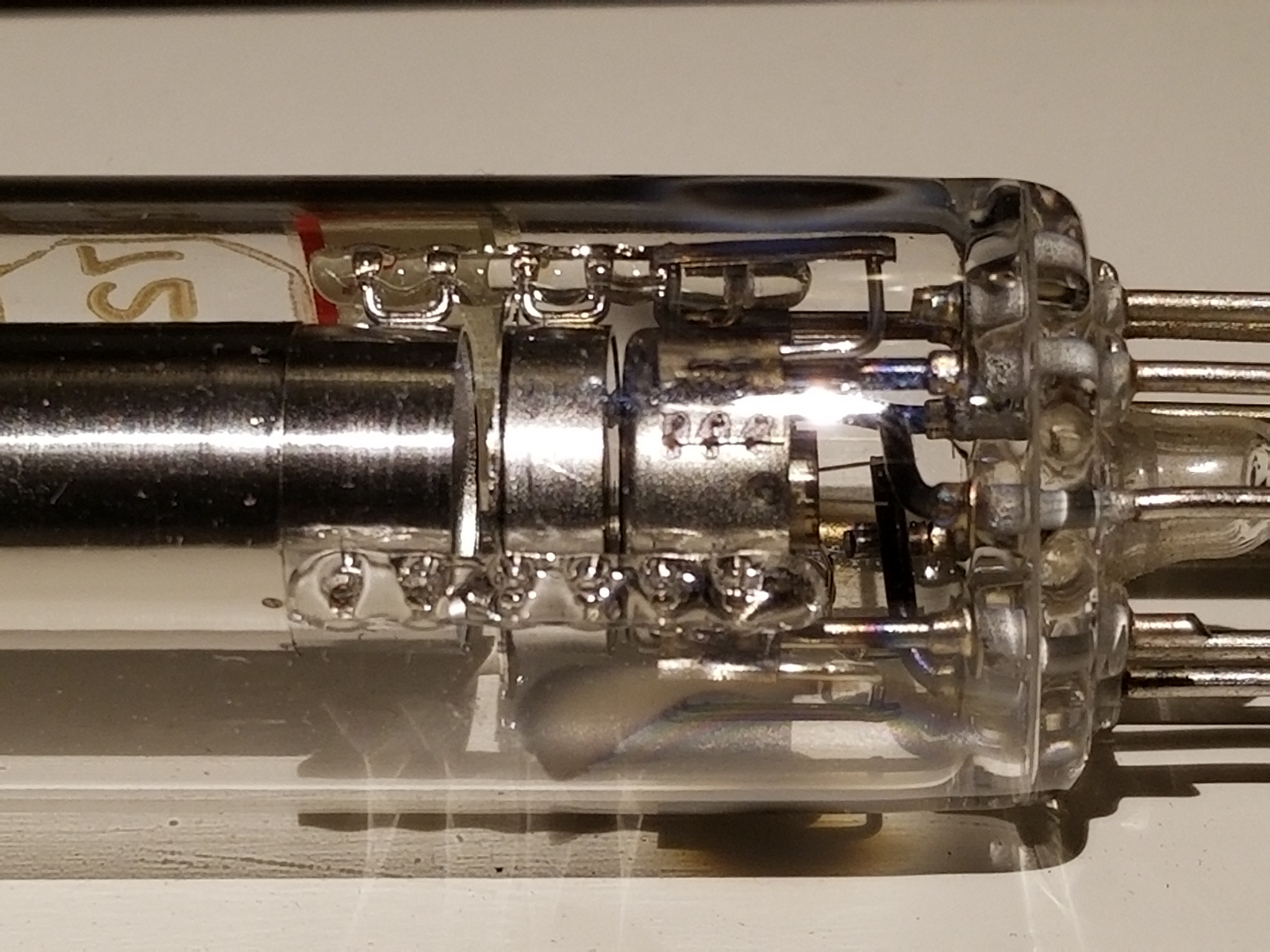
The electron gun from an RCA Vidicon video camera tube

An electron gun (also called electron emitter) is an electrical component in some vacuum tubes that produces a narrow, collimated electron beam that has a precise kinetic energy.

The largest use is in cathode-ray tubes (CRTs), used in older television sets, computer displays and oscilloscopes, before the advent of flat-panel displays. Electron guns are also used in field-emission displays (FEDs), which are essentially flat-panel displays made out of rows of extremely small cathode-ray tubes. They are also used in microwave linear beam vacuum tubes such as klystrons, inductive output tubes, travelling-wave tubes, and gyrotrons, as well as in scientific instruments such as electron microscopes and particle accelerators.

Electron guns may be classified by the type of electric field generation (DC or RF), by emission mechanism (thermionic, photocathode, cold emission, plasmas source), by focusing (pure electrostatic or with magnetic fields), or by the number of electrodes.

== Design ==
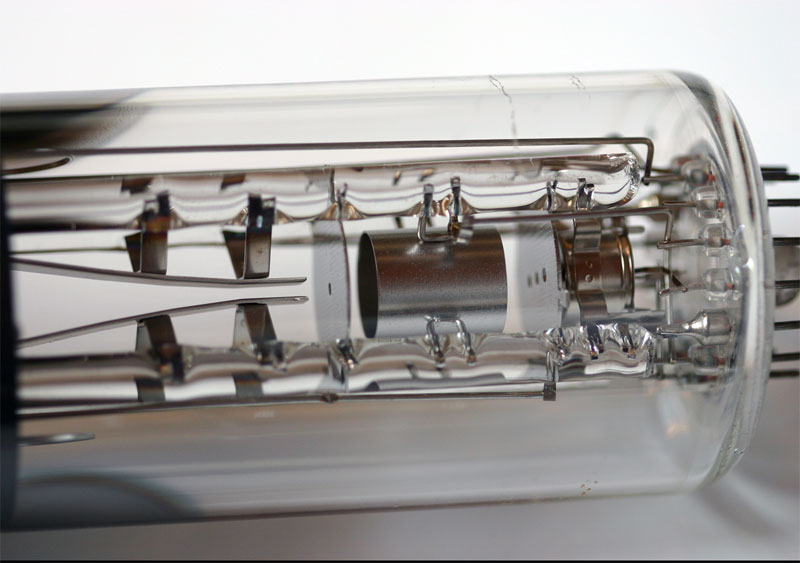
Electron gun from an oscilloscope CRT

Setup of an electron gun. 1. Hot cathode. 2. Wehnelt cylinder. 3. Anode

A direct current, electrostatic thermionic electron gun is formed from several parts: a hot cathode, which is heated to create a stream of electrons via thermionic emission; electrodes generating an electric field to focus the electron beam (such as a Wehnelt cylinder); and one or more anode electrodes which accelerate and further focus the beam. A large voltage difference between the cathode and anode accelerates the electrons away from the cathode. A repulsive ring placed between the electrodes focuses the electrons onto a small spot on the anode, at the expense of a lower extraction field strength on the cathode surface. There is often a hole through the anode at this small spot, through which the electrons pass to form a collimated beam before reaching a second anode, called the collector. This arrangement is similar to an Einzel lens.

An RF electron gun consists of a Microwave cavity, either single cell or multi-cell, and a cathode. In order to obtain a smaller beam emittance at a given beam current, a photocathode is used. An RF electron gun with a photocathode is called a photoinjector.

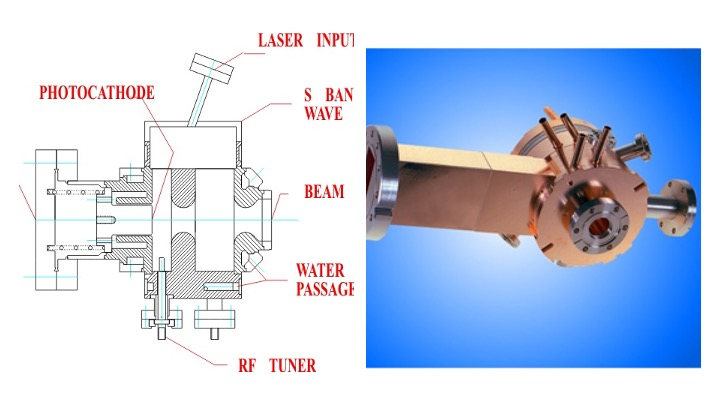
A photoinjector based on a "one and a half cells" microwave cavity at a frequency of 2856 MHz.

Photoinjectors play a leading role in X-ray Free-electron lasers and small beam emittance accelerator physics facilities.

== Applications ==
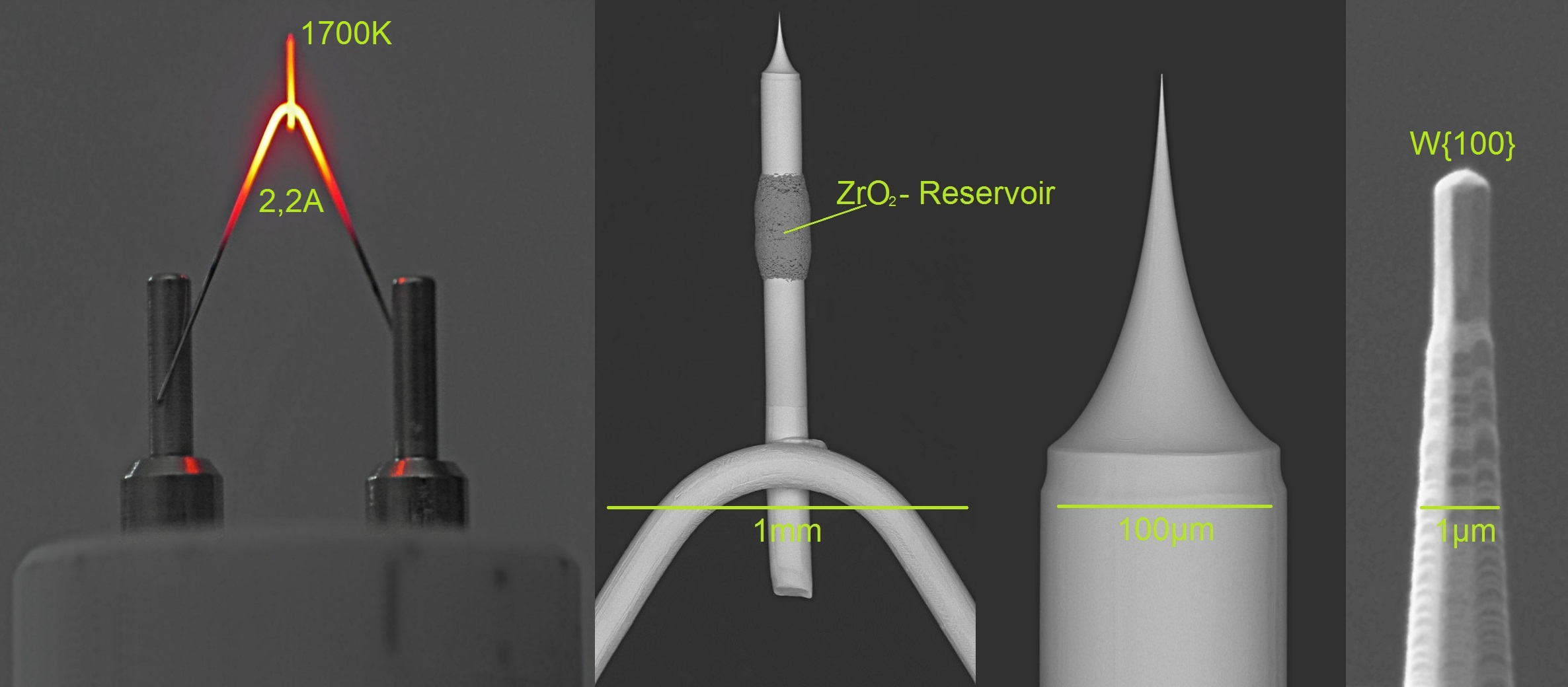
Schottky-emitter electron source of an electron microscope

The most common use of electron guns is in cathode-ray tubes, which were widely used in computer and television monitors before the advent of flat screen displays. Most color cathode-ray tubes incorporate three electron guns, each one producing a different stream of electrons. Each stream travels through a shadow mask where the electrons will impinge upon either a red, green or blue phosphor to light up a color pixel on the screen. The resultant color that is seen by the viewer will be a combination of these three primary colors.

An electron gun can also be used to ionize particles by adding electrons to, or removing electrons from an atom. This technology is sometimes used in mass spectrometry in a process called electron ionization to ionize vaporized or gaseous particles. More powerful electron guns are used for welding, metal coating, 3D metal printers, metal powder production and vacuum furnaces.

Electron guns are also used in medical applications to produce X-rays using a linac (linear accelerator); a high energy electron beam hits a target, stimulating emission of X-rays.

Electron guns are also used in travelling-wave tube amplifiers for microwave frequencies.

== Measurement and detection ==
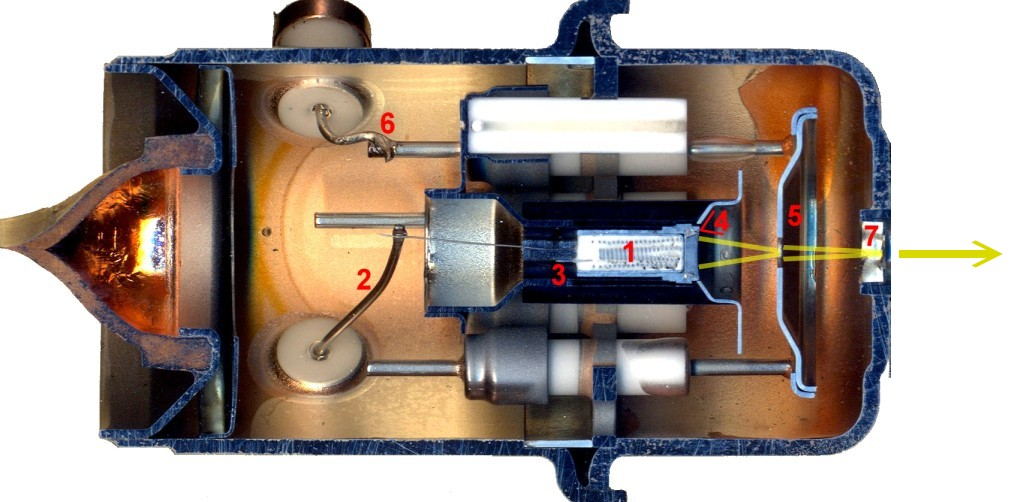
Electron gun from a travelling-wave tube, cutaway through axis to show construction

A nanocoulombmeter in combination with a Faraday cup can be used to detect and measure the beams emitted from electron gun and ion guns.

Another way to detect electron beams from an electron gun is by using a phosphor screen which will glow when struck by an electron.

== See also ==
- Optics
- Electron-beam technology
