= TV accessory =

Accessory that is used in conjunction with a compatible device

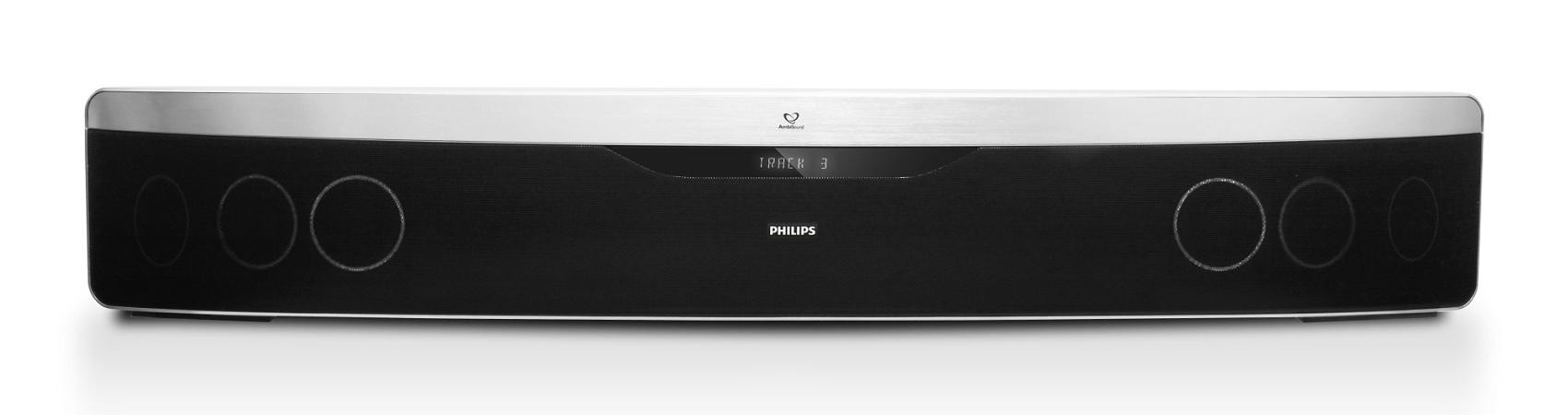
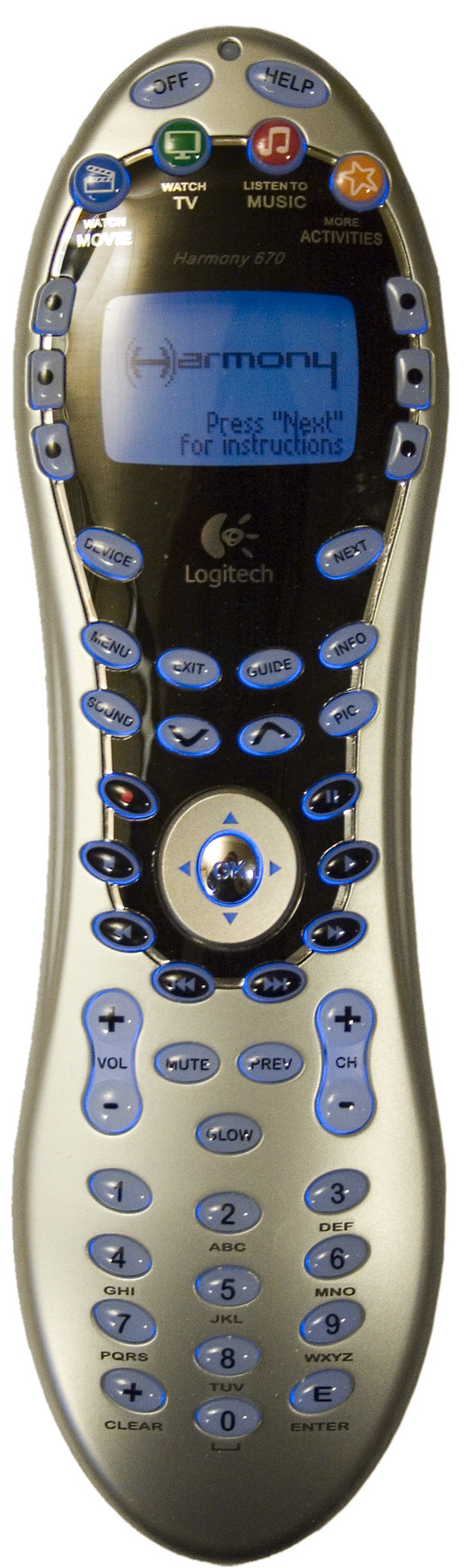
A soundbar (left) and a universal remote

A television accessory (TV accessory) is an accessory that is used in conjunction with a television (TV) or other compatible display device and is intended to either improve the user experience or to offer new possibilities of using it.

== History ==
The first TV accessory with which owners could actively influence the content displayed on the screen in real time was the Magnavox Odyssey, the first commercial home video game console, released in September 1972 by Magnavox for a list price of $99.95.

One of the first TV accessories that could record TV programs available to consumers was the Clie Pega-VR100K by Sony, released on October 9, 2003, for a list price of $479.99.

As of 2017, TV accessories are a rapidly growing market which is expected to grow even more rapidly in the near future. Some of the most popular manufacturers of TV accessories include Sony, Magnavox, Philips, LG, Apple, Nvidia, Amazon, Samsung, and Google, as well as many independent third-party suppliers.

== Types ==
=== Soundbars ===
A soundbar (also called sound bar or media bar) is a type of loudspeaker that projects audio from a wide enclosure. Soundbars are one of the most popular TV accessories because they are affordable, very easy to install and a relatively large upgrade compared to other accessories, offering much better sound than most integrated TV loudspeakers.

=== Universal remotes ===
A universal remote is a remote control that can be programmed to operate various brands of one or more types of consumer electronics devices.

On May 30, 1985, Philips introduced the first universal remote (U.S. Pat. #4774511) under the Magnavox brand name. In 1985, Robin Rumbolt, William "Russ" McIntyre, and Larry Goodson with North American Philips Consumer Electronics (Magnavox, Sylvania, and Philco) developed the first universal remote control.

=== Streaming television ===
Streaming television is the digital distribution of television content, such as TV shows, as streaming video delivered over the Internet. Most TVs today are smart TVs, meaning that they can connect to the Internet to use different functions. However, since there are many different TV manufacturers that use different interfaces for these functions, this may be confusing for some users. A dedicated streaming box like an Apple TV, Google Chromecast, Amazon Fire TV Stick or PlayStation TV offers a universal user experience across all TV brands. An Android TV box like the Nvidia Shield TV can also run all Android apps on the Play Store and stream PC gaming content to the TV.

=== HDMI switches ===
An HDMI switch (also known as HDMI switcher or HDMI switching box) is a device that accepts input from multiple HDMI sources and sends the signal you select to your HDTV via an HDMI cable. When they also support USB devices, they are KVM switches.

=== Home video game consoles ===
A home video game console is a type of video game console that is designed to be connected to a display device, such as a television, and an external power source as to play video games. In contrast to many other TV accessories that improve the user experience, a home video game console offers new possibilities of using a TV, meaning that users of such can not only determine what should be shown on the television screen, but also actively influence it in real time.
