= Premiere (TV program) =

First commercial color television program

- Genre: Special
- Directed by: Frances Buss; Fred Rickey
- Country of origin: United States
- Original language: English

Production
- Executive producer: Fred Rickey
- Production locations: New York City, NY
- Running time: 60 minutes

Original release
- Network: CBS
- Release: June 25, 1951

Premiere is the first commercially sponsored television program to be broadcast in color. The program was a variety show which aired as a special presentation on June 25, 1951, on a five-city network hook-up of Columbia Broadcasting System (CBS) television stations. Its airing was an initial step in CBS's brief and unsuccessful campaign to gain public acceptance of its field-sequential method of color broadcasting, which had recently been approved by the Federal Communications Commission (FCC) as the first commercial color television broadcasting standard for the United States.

== Competition for a U.S. color broadcasting standard ==
CBS's field-sequential color broadcasting system was an electro-mechanical system. It transmitted monochrome images electronically, and color was then added mechanically by placing a rapidly spinning (1440 r.p.m.) transparent tricolor disk in front of the television screen. This spinning Red-Green-Blue disk, when synchronized with a corresponding spinning disk in a color television camera, created the impression of full color. A major downside to the CBS system was that the video images being transmitted were not "compatible" with current monochrome television sets, meaning that unless these sets were modified they would render these video transmissions as meaningless lines and squiggles (with the very rare exception of some sets which would produce four small black-and-white images, one in each corner of the screen.)

During the past decade an often contentious competition had taken place to obtain official approval from the FCC for a U.S. color broadcasting method which would meet the FCC's criteria for cost, quality, and convenience. The primary challenger to CBS's system was an all-electronic color system employing a dot-sequential method which was being developed by the Radio Corporation of America (RCA), the parent company of the National Broadcasting Company (NBC). The RCA system had a distinct advantage in that it was compatible, meaning that current black-and-white televisions could receive a monochrome picture without any adjustments or modifications. However the color image produced on RCA's tricolor picture tubes had repeatedly been found unsatisfactory by the FCC.

On October 11, 1950 the FCC gave its official approval of CBS's field-sequential color system and stated that commercial color broadcasting could begin on November 20, 1950. Legal objections were immediately raised by RCA and others and the resulting court case worked its way through the courts up to the U.S. Supreme Court. On May 28, 1951 on an 8-1 vote the Supreme Court sided with the FCC, stating that commercial color programming could begin in twenty-five days. CBS announced that it would commence commercial broadcasting with Premiere on Monday, June 25, 1951. This would be the beginning of CBS's initial plan to broadcast twenty hours of color a week by autumn. RCA and others were still free to continue working on a competing compatible color system.

== Preparations for the color broadcast ==
CBS announced that it would colorcast Premiere live on a five-city network hook-up of East Coast CBS stations. New York City, Washington, D.C., Baltimore, Philadelphia, and Boston made up the colorcast network.

CBS planned to go forward even though few people would actually be able to view the event because there were very few color receivers available to the public. Due to nearly total manufacturer resistance there were currently no color sets being sold on the market. In response, CBS had recently acquired the television manufacturer Air King in order to manufacture a CBS-Columbia Model 12CC2 dual color/b&w television set. On the day that Premiere aired CBS placed a full-page advertisement for the set on page nine of the New York Times, although orders for the $499.95 set would not actually be taken until late September.

CBS lined up several of its best known stars to participate in its opening commercial colorcast, including Arthur Godfrey and Ed Sullivan. It signed up sixteen advertisers who spent close to an estimated $10,000 to sponsor the one-hour show. Seven advertisers reportedly spent $1000 each for a sixty-second announcement, and nine others spent $275 for a simple display of their products.

Rehearsals began on Thursday, June 21 and continued up to the broadcast. Directing duties were split between CBS Executive Producer Fred Rickey, who directed the entertainment, and CBS Director Frances Buss, who handled the commercials. A great amount of effort was made to get the display of colors right, with lighting angles being adjusted and props being changed and moved around. For the woman performers "regular TV color makeup" was used, including a special pink lipstick. The faces of some of the participants kept proving problematic and Ed Sullivan was asked to wear a cap when golfing that week because of the unflattering contrast of his deeply tanned face with the paler faces of the others. The intense lighting needed for the color broadcast made conditions very hot, with temperatures in the studio rising to around 120 degrees Fahrenheit (50 degrees Celsius.) Fans had to be turned off because they were too noisy. During the rehearsals part of the studio floor buckled and food items meant for display melted and ran. The performers and crew were just as stressed. CBS Vice President Adrian Murphy quipped, "Now I know how it feels to be pregnant."

== Synopsis of the June 25, 1951, broadcast ==
A five-minute test pattern led off the color broadcast at 4:30 p.m., EDT.

Premiere began at 4:35 p.m., EDT. It was opened by "Patty Painter" (Patricia Stinnette) a professional model and West Virginia native who for many years had been employed by CBS to pose for on-camera tests of its color television system. By the time of this broadcast she had done more than one thousand color presentations and demonstrations, thus earning such nicknames as "Miss CBS Color" and "Miss Color Television." During this program she would perform some of her usual video tasks, such as pouring the contents of a bottle of beer into a glass. She introduced Arthur Godfrey, the host of the first half-hour, who greeted the viewers with the self-deprecating quip about how "awful" it must be to see his face. During the first half-hour he would present several commercial products as well as strum on a guitar and sing "On Top of Old Smoky".

Three individuals then made brief congratulatory remarks: William S. Paley, CBS Board Chairman; Frank Stanton, CBS President; and Wayne Coy, FCC Chairman. Chairman Coy addressed the timing of the FCC's decision, stating that the FCC "sincerely believed that color in television now is more important than a promise of color in the future. Such promises in the past have had a way of going unfulfilled."

Next to appear was Faye Emerson, dressed in a blue gown. During her appearance she presented several colorful paintings which had been provided by the New York Metropolitan Museum of Art and by the New York Museum of Modern Art. The paintings on display ranged from Picasso's Girl before a Mirror to a Hopper and a Renoir. She also did a presentation for sponsor Pepsi-Cola and bantered a bit with humorist Sam Levenson who stated how glad he was to be alive in these times.

In the second half-hour Ed Sullivan showed up for hosting duties, announcing that "CBS is putting blood into the coaxial cable." During his segment he promoted Mercury and Lincoln automobiles. Robert Alda and Isabel Bigley, current performers in the Broadway musical Guys and Dolls, sang a duet of "You're Just in Love" by Irving Berlin from the stage musical Call Me Madam. Ed Sullivan also joked around with the Bil and Cora Baird Marionettes, who serenaded him with E. Y. Harburg's "You, Too, Can Be a Puppet" from the musical Flahooley.

Garry Moore was the next to appear, declaring "when Dr. Stanton sees me in color he'll say to himself, 'For this I went to the Supreme Court?'" During his appearance Moore showcased several commercial products, including Tenderleaf tea, Aunt Jemima, Duz powdered washing soap, Ivory soap and Chase and Sanborn coffee. He was also joined by Durward Kirby in a well-received comedy skit in which Moore played a pitchman who attempted to demonstrate a hopelessly useless vegetable slicer.

The New York City Ballet company then performed La Valse, choreographed by George Balanchine to music by Maurice Ravel, with staging by Sol Hurok.

The show wrapped up with some additional banter between Sullivan and the Baird Marionettes. Archie Bleyer and his orchestra had provided the music for the hour. Other commercial products promoted during the program included Wrigley's gum, Toni Home Permanent and Revlon lipstick.

== Five participating CBS cities ==
According to the CBS press release issued for release on the day the program aired, Premiere originated from CBS-TV's Studio 57 in New York City and was then transmitted from the studio by coaxial cable to CBS Master Control, which then sent it by telephone circuit to the local CBS transmitter for its New York City broadcast. The four other participating CBS affiliates then received the show by coaxial cable. All five participating stations used their regular transmitters to send the broadcast signal out on the station's usual TV channel. Local newspaper television listings warned TV owners that they would be able to hear, but not see, the telecast.

During the day of the broadcast CBS had a very limited number of color receivers on hand. Some of these were needed in-house to produce the show, so only approximately twenty receivers were made available through CBS to the various public and private viewing sites which had been set up for the event. In New York City and Washington, DC this small number was augmented by many homemade units which hobbyists and others had constructed earlier in order to view the experimental CBS color broadcasts which had been going on locally in those two cities.

New York City, NY (WCBS-TV, Channel 2): Eight color receivers were placed by CBS in their studio at 49 East 52nd Street. Four hundred guests, including members of the press and advertising people, were invited to watch. Although CBS provided no sets for viewing by the general public that day, it estimated that there were 1000 homemade units available around the city.

Washington, DC (WTOP-TV, Channel 9): There were four CBS color receivers in the city, none of which were made available to the general public that day. One color set was placed at the Carlton Hotel (two blocks north of the White House) to provide private viewing for government officials and members of the press and such. The other three receivers were located at: WTOP-TV Studio One in the Warner Building; the office of John Hayes, WTOP-TV President; and at the Channel 9 transmitter at 40th and Brandywine, NW. An estimated 125 homemade receivers had already been constructed by hobbyists to view the earlier experimental DC color broadcasts. Unfortunately, many of these hobbyists had always been able to take advantage of the fact that their receivers were using the same local source of electricity that was being used by the WTOP-TV cameras, so there was no need to include an adjustment mechanism that would detect the transmitted electric pulse designed to synchronize the spin of their unit's color disks with that of the color camera's. However the New York cameras were using a different source of electricity and the difference put the spin of many of the amateur DC color disks out of sync with New York.

Baltimore, MD (WMAR-TV Channel 2): WMAR-TV had two CBS 10-inch color receivers set up for public viewing. One was located in the lobby of the Baltimore Sun's new Sunpapers' Building on and had an estimated crowd of 200. The other was placed in the lobby of the old Sunpapers' Building and had an estimated crowd of 400. (Both the Baltimore Sun and WMAR-TV were owned by the A. S. Abell Company.) The receiver in the old Sunpapers' Building suffered "mechanical difficulties."

Philadelphia, PA (WCAU-TV, Channel 10): Two receivers were supplied by CBS. One was set up for private viewing in WCAU-TV's auditorium. The other allowed for public viewing in the station's lobby. Five people called in to the station to report that they were one of the few who had black-and-white TVs which were picking up four small monochrome pictures, one in each corner of the screen.

Boston, MA (WNAC-TV, Channel 7): CBS provided three color receivers. One went into the Princess Ballroom of the Hotel Somerset for private viewing by the members of the press and others. The two other sets were placed for public viewing on the fifth floor of the Jordan Marsh Company department store, one in the Exhibition Hall, and one in the Fashion Center.

== Reaction to the color broadcast ==
In spite of the challenges faced in the studio the show went off as planned and reactions to the broadcast were generally positive, but with some reservations. The colorful appearance of many of the objects displayed on the program proved to be quite eye-catching, with several write-ups stating that the color was better than movie color. Especially appealing were the brightly labeled commercial products being showcased. A number of reviews mentioned that color TV proved it could be a very compelling advertising medium.

But a nearly universal observation was that the human performers did not fare nearly as well as the products. When the performers moved their heads, the coloring of their faces varied, even washing out. Other reports mentioned the sometimes curious look of peoples' hair and clothes. Improvements in lighting techniques would hopefully solve this problem.

Several people who were interviewed expressed the desire to buy a color set, and this again pointed up the problem of the near-total absence of color receivers. Indeed, many reports mentioned that this had been a historic television event with very few witnesses. CBS estimated the total number of viewers from all sources to be 40,000.

If most of the public wanted to watch CBS color broadcasts in any form over the next few months they would have to rely on their current black-and-white televisions and then install one of three devices which were just coming onto the market. If they just wanted to watch the color broadcast in black-and-white they would have to buy and install an external "adapter" which produced a monochrome, but smaller, picture (using only 405 lines of a standard set's 525). If they wished to watch a color broadcast in color they would have to buy and install a "converter", which paired the adapter with a spinning tricolor disk that slid in front of the screen (a magnifying lens was usually included.) However a converter was limited to television screens of up to around 12 inches (30 centimeters). So those who wanted to keep their existing large-screen black-and-white TVs would have to buy a "companion set" (also called a "slave-unit"), which was a separate unit containing an enclosed picture tube with color disk, and which came with a cord that plugged into the circuitry of the adjacent black-and-white TV. For many of the ten to twelve million owners of existing sets these options seemed too complicated or expensive, especially if compatible color ended up making the CBS color system redundant or even obsolete.

And the FCC was allowing work to continue on compatible color. On the Friday before Premiere's airing, Allen B. DuMont, founder of DuMont Laboratories and the DuMont Television Network, contacted the FCC requesting that it postpone CBS's commercial color programming in light of recent improvements to RCA's compatible tricolor picture tube. His request was turned down, so while Premiere was airing Dr. DuMont invited members of the press to his Passaic, New Jersey laboratories to view a demonstration of color on this improved RCA tube. Closed-circuit color still images were displayed which to the viewing press seemed similar in quality to the CBS color broadcast which could be viewed in a separate room. NBC had already announced that starting July 9, 1951 it would begin authorized experimental broadcasts in New York City of RCA compatible color, with public demonstrations of the WNBT-TV broadcasts on RCA color receivers In addition, the National Television System Committee (NTSC), which had helped craft the original U.S. monochrome television broadcasting standards in 1941, had already reorganized in order to implement an all-industry plan which would pool together the knowledge and resources of the NTSC, RCA, General Electric and others to create a new "composite" compatible color system which it hoped would prove acceptable to the FCC.

== Aftermath and exit ==
After the Monday airing of Premiere many of the color receivers which CBS had used to exhibit the broadcast were moved to various public locations such as downtown department stores, part of CBS's strategy to give its color broadcasts as much public exposure as possible. That week saw the debuts of two half-hour Monday-to-Friday color series. On Tuesday at 4:30 p.m. The World is Yours started its run. On Wednesday at 10:30 a.m. Modern Homemakers began. In the following weeks CBS extended its color broadcasting into the Midwest and began adding more color programs, including a series of Saturday college football games.

On September 28, 1951, a New York Times ad announced that orders would now be taken for the CBS-Columbia combination color/black-and-white TV set which it had first advertised the day when Premiere aired three months earlier. Color viewership during these months had remained small and advertisers had mostly stayed away. Then on October 19, 1951 U.S. defense mobilizer Charles E. Wilson, head of the Office of Defense Mobilization (ODM), sent a letter to CBS president Frank Stanton requesting the suspension of the manufacture of color sets, stating that the increased requirements for the Korean emergency were more important than developing a new but nonessential product. CBS immediately complied and went further by ending all color broadcasting the next day after airing the North Carolina-Maryland college football game. This abrupt halt led Dr. DuMont and others to claim that CBS had found a face-saving way to exit from a doomed undertaking.

NPA Order M-90, the regulation issued in 1951 by the National Production Authority (NPA) which had officially suspended color television set manufacturing, was rescinded in March 1953. However at that time CBS stated that it was no longer interested in continuing with its field-sequential color system. On December 17, 1953 the new "composite" dot-sequential color broadcasting method which had been developed through the Second NTSC was officially approved by the FCC as the replacement U.S. commercial color television system standard.
