= Rafael Mikhailovich Minasbekyan =

- Born: 2 February 1968 (age 58); Yerevan, Armenian SSR, USSR
- Occupations: Doctor, producer, economist, top manager, screenwriter, director, insurance provider, marketing expert, sociologist, world traveler

Rafael Minasbekyan – doctor, producer, economist, top manager, screenwriter, director, insurance provider, marketing expert, sociologist, world traveler. Born in Yerevan on February 2, 1968.

== Family ==
Father – Mikhail Sergeyevich Minasbekyan, Academician of the Engineering Academy of Sciences of Armenia, Academician of the Russian Academy of Natural Sciences (geopolitics and security). Founder of the Armenian aviation industry. Statesman and politician, First secretary of the Yerevan City Party Committee, deputy of the Supreme Soviet of the USSR, Head of the USSR State Committee for Nationalities.

Mother – Irma Rafaelovna Armaganova, French language teacher.

Paternal Grandfather – Sergey Grigoryevich Minasbekov, People's Commissar of the Timber Industry of Armenia, first Armenian lightweight boxing champion.

Paternal Grandmother – Gayane Artyomovna Osipyan, daughter of General Artyom Osipyants of the Tsarist Army.

Maternal Grandfather – Rafael Nagapetovich Armaganov, Colonel in the border troops, Deputy Head of the Transcaucasian Border District of the USSR, Deputy Minister of Communications of the Armenian SSR.

Maternal Grandmother – Maria Levonovna Adamyan, descendant of the princely Argutinsky family. Niece of Hovhannes Abgari Adamian, the creator of color television.

Brother – Sergey Mikhailovich Minasbekyan (1964–2008).

Spouse – Sona Feliksovna Tamrazyan (1979), a pianist.

Son Grigory (2000) and daughter Maria (2001).

== Education ==
1984 – graduated from the Kamo middle school No. 76, which specializes in French.

1984 – entered the Yerevan State Medical Institute (ErMI), graduating in 1992 as a surgeon and medical doctor.

1987-1989 – served in the Border Troops of the USSR.

1995 – completed a clinical residency in psychiatry with honors.

2006 – graduated from the Moscow Academy of Labor Market and Information Technology (MARTIT) with a degree in organization and crisis management.

== Career ==
1990 – created the KVN ErMI team with a group of friends. In 1992 and 1994, he captained his team to win the championship of the Major KVN League. In 1995, he was captain of the CIS Team and one of the captains of the KVN World Team.

1991 – began working as a television producer, screenwriter, and director

1993-1994 – Managing Partner, Chairman of the Board of the 'CHARM' Cultural and Commercial Company, Yerevan

1994-1997 – Managing Partner, President of the Amber production group, Moscow

1997-2002 – Managing Partner, President of 'Gorod' television studio, Moscow

2002-2015 – worked at the 'Rosgosstrakh' Russian State Insurance Company as a member of the Board of Directors and Management Board, Deputy General Director, and Vice President, as well as Head of Business Strategy and Communications

2004-2015:

- Russ-Bank – Member of the Board of Directors
- Providna (Ukraine) – Member of the Board of Directors
- Moldasig (Moldova) – Member of the Board of Directors
- Rossgosstrakh-Armenia – Founder and Member of the Board of Directors
- Rossgosstrakh-Belarus – Member of the Board of Directors
- RAT (Russian Automobile Partnership) / RAF (Russian Automobile Fellowship) – Founder, Managing Partner, Member of the Board of Directors

From 2015 to 2021, Rafael Minasbekyan served as CEO of the KIT Group of Companies (Cinema, Internet, Television), which is part of Russia's largest media holding, Gazprom-Media (GPM). The KIT Group unites companies engaged in renting, distributing, and producing feature films and TV series. Among these are:

- Central Partnership – a major film distributor, exclusive representative of Hollywood film studios, including Paramount Pictures, Lionsgate, and Summit Entertainment
- KIT Film Studio – a major producer of feature films and TV series (the studio produced 350 hours of film content in 2019)
- Belye Nochi (White Nights) – independent film distributor

The group of companies managed by Rafael Minasbekyan also included Red Media Holding, which manages a large portfolio of thematic television channels, distributing 38 paid channels, 17 of which were in-house productions. All the GPM KIT Group companies were leaders in their market segments.

In 2021, Rafael Minasbekyan created MIRFILM and became the film company's CEO

MIRFILM is a film company with its own production and post-production studio that makes feature films, documentaries, and TV series. The company brings together industry professionals with extensive film experience all over the world.

== Achievements ==
· Member of the Russian Academy of Motion Pictures Arts and Sciences

· Member of the Armenian National Film Academy

· Economics PhD. In 2006, defended his dissertation entitled 'Developing an enterprise's intellectual capital using IT to create high-tech products'

· Ranked Producer No. 1 in the 2020 Film Distributor's Bulletin

· In 2020, the film Son of a Rich became Russia's highest-grossing film

· Silver Skates became the first Russian film on Netflix

· The Russian film Mermaid: The Lake of the Dead has been sold in 155 countries around the world

· The drama Gerda won two prizes at the 74th Locarno International Film Festival in 2021: for the best actress and a special prize from the Youth Jury

· The Russian TV series Epidemic was in the top 5 on Netflix worldwide]

· The Italian film Atlantis, co-created by Rafael Minasbekyan, was presented in the Horizons section of the Venice Film Festival

· Boundless – a historical mini-series that premiered on Amazon Prime on June 10, 2022

· Consultant was the most popular series of 2016

· GMP KIT had the largest production volume in 2019, with 350 hours

== Creative Activities ==
Rafael Minasbekyan has been the creator, producer, screenwriter, and director of more than 300 feature films, documentaries, animated films, marketing programs, music albums, highly rated series, and television programs.

=== Filmography ===
General Producer of Feature Films

1. Guantanamera (2025)

2. Karuza (2025)

3. Atlantis (2021)

4. The World Champion (2021)

5. Dark Spell (2021)

6. Gerda (2021)

7. Row 19 (2021)

8. My Dad’s Not a Gift (2021)

9. Couple from the Future (2021)

10. The Ice Demon (2021)

11. Coma (2020)

12. The Widow (2020)

13. Baba Yaga: Terror of the Dark Forest (2020)

14. Streltsov (2020)

15. Fire (2020)

16. Silver Skates (2020)

17. Chernobyl: Abyss (2020)

18. Doctor Lisa (2020)

19. The Ninth (2019)

20. Billion (2019)

21. The (UN)perfect Guy (2019)

22. Son of a Rich (2019)

23. Robo (2019)

24. Text (2019)

25. To the Lake (2019)

26. The Mermaid: The Lake of the Dead (2018)

27. Zero (2018)

28. Ailing Angel (2018)

29. Furious (2017)

30. Frontier (2017)

31. Young (2016)

32. Generation P (2011)

33. Zemlyak (2010)

34. Old Songs About the Main Thing (1998)

General Producer of TV Series

1. Louis Pavilion

2. Naparniki (2022)

3. Boundless (2022)

4. One Chance for Three (2022)

5. Military Police (2022)

6. Resort of Khaki Colour (2021)

7. The Cathedral (2021)

8. The Official (2021)

9. The Stranger (2021)

10. Bim (2021)

11. Ninel (2021)

12. Port (2021)

13. There Are No Former Gangsters (2021)

14. The Mutiny (2020)

15. The Mistress of the Mountain (2020)

16. Criminal code article105 (2020)

17. Alyosha (2020)

18. Survivors (2020)

19. Wolf (2020)

20. Marlen (2020)

21. Morozov (2020)

22. Street Justice (2020)

23. Dusks and Dawns (2020)

24. Rostov (2019)

25. Caged (2019)

26. Sunshine Investigations (2019)

27. Rapid Response (2019)

28. Flash point (2019)

29. Wolf Trap (2019)

30. Three Captains (2019)

31. More Than Love (2019)

32. The Lightkeeper (2018)

33. I'm Alive... (2018)

34. Badaber Fortress (2018)

35. To the Lake (2018)

36. Island of the Doomed (2018)

37. Sultan of My Heart (2018)

38. Stepfather (2018)

39. Battalion (2018)

40. Up in the Sky (2018)

41. Expert (2018)

42. Strong Weak Woman (2018)

43. Live Bomb (2018)

44. Interns (2018)

45. 99% Dead (2017)

46. The Elusive (2017)

47. Someone Else's Grandpa (2017)

48. The Ministry (2017)

49. Graveyard Shift (2017)

50. Alive (2017)

51. Rustle. The Big Deal (2017)

52. Line of Fire (2017)

53. Kuba (2016)

54. The Consultant (2016)

55. Devil Hunt (2016)

56. Beglets (2016)

57. Dela Smeshnye, Dela Semeynye (1996)

General Producer of Documentary Films

1. Oxygen. Everest (2024)

2. Oxygen (2022)

3. In Love with Sochi... (2017)

4. Rob Sahakyants. The Last Hippy of the Pink City (2010)

5. Story of a Photo (2009)

6. Pray to God for Us (2002)

== Cinema, Television, and Business Awards ==
Winner of more than 25 awards

- 7x winner of the 'Golden Salamander' – the highest annual award of the Russian insurance community
- Winner of the 'Media Manager of Russia' award – the country's main media business award for contributions to the development of the industry, innovative approaches, and the implementation of unique marketing concepts (2011).
- APKiT Award for the TV film Beglets for the NTV channel in the 'Best TV Movie of 2017' category (2017)
- APKiT Award for the Badaber Fortress TV series for Channel One in the 'Best TV Movie of 2018' category (2018)
- APKiT Award for the film Text in the 'Best Feature Film' category (2019)
- APKiT Award for the Battalion TV series for NTV in the 'Best TV Movie of 2019' category
- APKiT Award for the film Silver Skates in the 'Best Feature Film' category (2022)
- Golden Eagle award for the film Text in the 'Best Film of 2019' category
- Golden Eagle award for the film Silver Skates in the 'Best Film of 2022' category
- Golden Eagle award for the film The World Champion in the 'Best Film of 2023' category
- The International Sports Film Festival's KRASNOGORSKI Award for the Oxygen documentary series (2023)
- The International Sports Film Festival's KRASNOGORSKI Award for the documentary In Love with Sochi… (2018)
- The Finisterra Arrabida International Film Art & Tourism Festival award in the 'Best Advertising Movies' category for a GPM KIT Group promo video, written and produced by Rafael Minasbekyan
- Filmservice International award for a corporate film dedicated to the 5th anniversary of GMP KIT (2015-2020)
- International DRAWTASTIC (USA) Animation Festival award in the 'Best Advertisement' category. The festival's main honor, the 'Golden Pencil Award', went to KIT Film Studio's ident, which was directed by Oscar-winning animator Alexander Petrov. The project was created and produced by Rafael Minasbekyan.
- Winner of the Grand Prix of the national 'Media Manager of Russia' awards "For outstanding industry achievements, creation, and effective management of the GPM KIT Group of Companies, which has taken a leading position in the market" (2020)

== Additional Information ==
- In 1985, Rafael Minasbekyan became the Armenian champion of alpine tourism and mountaineering as part of his institute's team.
- Made a unique ascent to all four peaks of Mount Ararats in one day
- Climbed Mount Ararat in 2010, participated in various extreme expeditions. Hiked the Ukok Plateau following a route from the village of Jazator to the ascent of Mount Belukha. Hiked across the ice of Lake Baikal, from Olkhon to the Ivolginsky Datsan. Visited the Sahara Desert, the jungles of Cambodia, etc.
- Holds a diploma as an instructor and judge in alpine tourism and mountaineering
- Certified as a 3-Star CMAS Diving Instructor
- The only captain of a KVN team in the history of the KVN club to win all of the captain's competitions he participated in
- One of the founders of the international MAF CLUB system (the psychological, social deduction game called Mafia), one of the four authors of the current rules of the Mafia game, and founder of MAFIA CLUB Moscow
- Recognized as the best player of the decade from 2002 to 2012, according to the results of the annual official Mafia World Championships
- 2011 World Champion in the Belot card game (according to the MAF CLUB system)
- In 2002, was one of the organizers and creators of the international 'Armenia 2020' project, which was dedicated to forecasting long-term scenarios for the development of the Republic of Armenia
- In 2019, the 'KIT Territory' social and cultural project was launched at the largest children's centers: Orlyonok, Smena, Artek, and Ocean. The project gives children the opportunity to get acquainted with films, chat with actors and directors, and listen to a course of lectures on cinema. Tens of thousands of children across the country have participated in the project.
- Rafael Minasbekyan's Great Uncle, Artyom Yakovlevich Karapetyan, was an outstanding Soviet dubbing actor, actor, director
- Rafael Minasbekyan's Great Uncle, Mark Danilovich Osepyan, was an outstanding Soviet film director
- Davil Avakovich Minasbekov is Rafael Minasbekyan's Great Uncle
- In 2004, created the Rosgosstrakh's Center for Strategic Research (CSR) along with Doctor of Economics Alexei Nikolaevich Zoubets.
- The Center for Strategic Research (CSR) engaged in sociological and macroeconomic research and forecasts. The research was conducted using representative samples not only for the country as a whole, but also for every major city in Russia. Results and forecasts from CSR research were reportedly cited thousands of times per year. The CSR developed unique indexes, including the 'cost' of human life, which measures the Russian population's quality of life, economic outlook, and level of satisfaction with their lives.

== Writings ==
Author of academic publications, articles, and books

- Minasbekyan, Rafael Mikhailovich Developing an enterprise's intellectual capital using IT to create high-tech products: PhD in Economics, 2006
- Shatrakov A. Yu., Parfenova M. Ya., Minasbekyan R. M. Intellectual Capital in Industrial Enterprises. Moscow: MARTIT, 2006
- Minasbekyan R.M. GOSSTRAKH poster – Moscow: Meshcheryakova Publishing House, 2012
- Minasbekyan R. M. Dynamic and static parts of an enterprise's intellectual capital as a methodological component in its development // Moscow Academy of Labor Market and Information Technologies Bulletin № 12, 2004
- Minasbekyan R. M. The concept of building machine-oriented technologies to increase the intellectual capital of an enterprise // Moscow Academy of Labor Market and Information Technologies Bulletin № 18, 2005
- Minasbekyan R. M., Ivanov A.S. Mechanisms for increasing the intellectual capital of an enterprise for the organization of competitive production // Moscow Academy of Labor Market and Information Technologies Bulletin № 30, 2006
- Minasbekyan R. M. Creation of objective prerequisites for insuring specialists in Russia's high-tech complex // Moscow Academy of Labor Market and Information Technologies Bulletin № 30, 2006
