= Frances Buss Buch =

- Born: June 3, 1917; St. Louis, Missouri, U.S.
- Died: January 19, 2010 (aged 92); Hendersonville, North Carolina, U.S.
- Occupations: Television director and producer

Frances Buss Buch (June 3, 1917 – January 19, 2010) was the first female television director in the United States.

== Career ==
Buch grew up in Saint Louis, Missouri, and attended Washington University. In the early 1940s she relocated to New York City, where she had taken acting classes and appeared in some off-Broadway productions. In July 1941 she was hired by CBS for a temporary job as receptionist.

She transferred to the fledgling CBS Television two weeks after the Federal Communications Commission allowed commercial TV broadcasts in 1941. With Gil Fates as producer and host, she was scorekeeper on CBS Television Quiz the earliest U.S. live television game show.

"I had seen TV at the World's Fair, but I had no idea this existed in New York. CBS was a radio network," Buch told a reporter from the Asheville Citizen-Times in 2008.

Along with CBS Television Quiz, she helped coordinate the CBS television news coverage of the attack on Pearl Harbor.

When CBS live TV broadcasts were suspended in 1942, Buch began producing and directing U.S. Navy training films. She returned to CBS in 1944 when their live television broadcasts resumed and was promoted to director in 1945.

On June 25, 1951, she directed the commercials on Premiere, the first commercial color TV program to be broadcast in the United States. Later that same week she began the job of producer-director for the first two color TV series to be broadcast, The World is Yours, and Modern Homemakers. She also directed the early television talk show, Mike and Buff (1951–1953), which featured Mike Wallace and his then-wife Buff Cobb.

In 1949 she married Bill Buch, whom she had met in Florida while making Navy training films. She resigned from CBS in 1954 to be a full-time homemaker.
