= Color Television Inc. =

American research and development firm

Color Television, Inc.
- Industry: Color television research and development
- Founded: 1947; 79 years ago
- Defunct: October 1951
- Fate: Production halted following Korean War conservation efforts
- Headquarters: San Francisco, California, United States
- Key people: Arthur S. Matthews (President); George E. Sleeper, Jr. (Vice president and chief engineer)

Color Television Inc. was an American research and development firm founded in 1947 and devoted to creating a color television system to be approved by the Federal Communications Commission as the U.S. color broadcasting standard. Its system was one of three considered in a series of FCC hearings from September 1949 to May 1950.

== Background ==
Unlike the winning field-sequential color system by CBS, the line sequential CTI system was all-electronic with no color scanning disk, and fully compatible with existing black and white receivers. Unlike the dot sequential RCA system, it used only one scanning tube in the camera and one picture tube in the receiver. CTI's camera used three lenses, behind which were mounted red, blue, and green color filters that produced three images side by side on a single scanning tube. At the receiver, the three images were received on three separate areas of a picture tube, each area treated with different phosphorescent compounds that glowed in red, blue, or green. Superimposing lenses were used to merge the separate images into a single color image on a rear projection screen in the television set.

== History ==
The CTI system was first demonstrated to the FCC in Washington, D.C., on February 20, 1950, by which time CTI had spent $600,000 to develop the system. The CBS, RCA, and CTI systems were compared side by side three days later. Billboard reported that FCC insiders said that CTI's system came in third place, on the basis of color registry and definition. "CTI's sets lacked intensity," it said, "but while its colors were of a hazy blue-violet cast, some engineers believed that it showed potentialities." A writer for Popular Science similarly reported that the colors were not true, nor were they in register.

On August 29, CTI declared in a petition to the FCC that it had invented a "wholly new" color system, which it called "uniplex". Nonetheless, the FCC released a report on September 1 strongly favoring the CBS system. The FCC issued its final report, choosing CBS, on October 11. In reply to CTI's petition to reopen the hearings, the FCC said that "new ideas and new inventions are matters of weekly, even daily, occurrence," and therefore the Commission had to make a decision at some point. But it held the door open, adding that it "cannot refuse to consider" improved color systems are they are developed.

CTI negotiated a $4 million contract in August 1951 to manufacture airborne radar and other electronic products, planning to use the revenue to further develop its color television system for public acceptance. Nothing further was heard from CTI after the Defense Production Administration suspended the mass production of color television receivers in October 1951 "to conserve critical materials" for the duration of the Korean War.

The firm was based in San Francisco, California. George E. Sleeper, Jr. was Vice President and Chief Engineer. Arthur S. Matthews was President.
