= Early Television Museum =

Museum of television receivers in Ohio, US

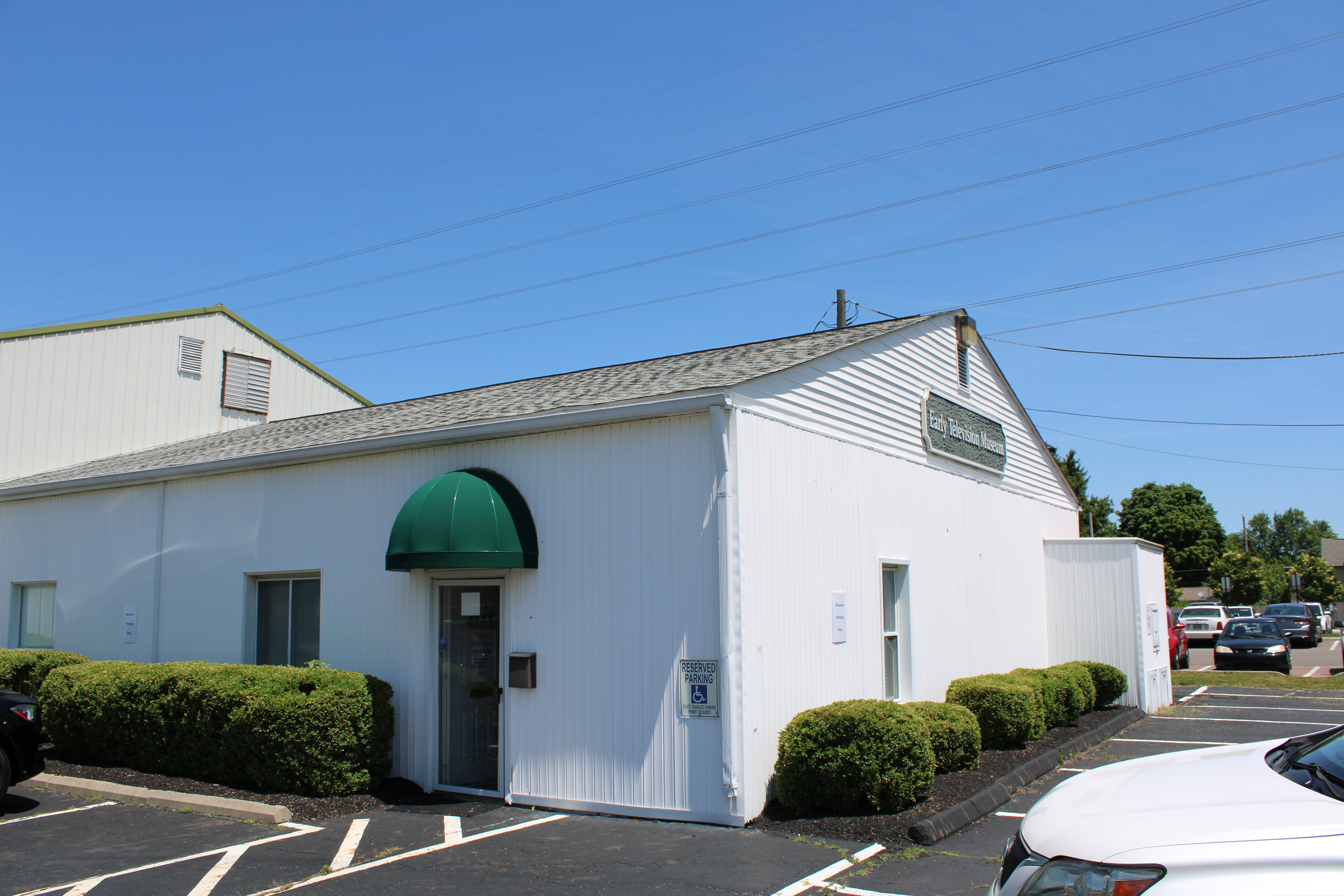
- Established: 24 July 2000
- Location: 5396 Franklin St, Hilliard, OH
- Coordinates: 40°02′05″N 83°09′42″W
- Founder: Steve McVoy
- Owner: Early Television Foundation
- Parking: On site (no charge)
- Website: www.earlytelevision.org

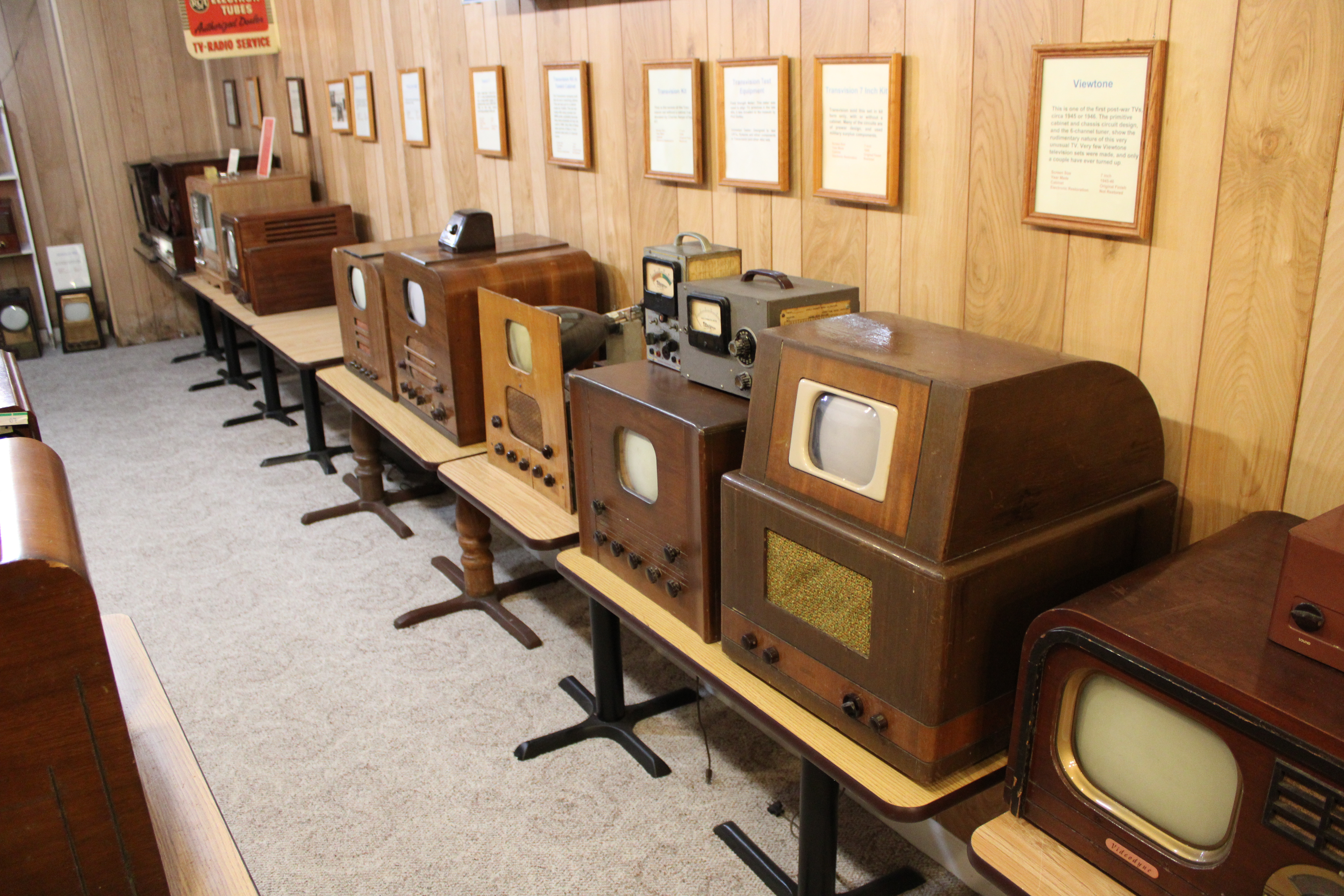
Post WWII television sets on display

The Early Television Museum is a museum of early television receiver sets. It is located in Hilliard, a suburb of Columbus, Ohio.

The museum has over 150 TV sets including mechanical TVs from the 1920s and 1930s; pre-World War II British sets from 1936 to 1939; pre-war American sets from 1939 to 1941; post-war American, British, French and German sets from 1945 to 1960; and early color sets from 1953 to 1957 including an RCA Victor CT-100. Many of these sets are working. It is the largest collection in the United States.

The Dave Johnson collection of early television cathode ray tubes is also at the museum, along with early TV studio equipment, which includes a working 60-line flying-spot scanner TV camera. Visitors are pictured by this camera as they would have appeared on mechanical television in 1931.

The museum is a non-profit foundation operated by the Early Television Foundation, which hosts an annual conference at the museum.
