= Westinghouse H840CK15 =

The Westinghouse H840CK15 was the second consumer all-electronic color television set offered for sale in the United States on February 28, 1954. It used the 15GP22 cathode ray tube. The set was discontinued about six months after its introduction because of larger and less expensive 19 and 21-inch color sets becoming available in July and December 1954 from manufacturers such as Motorola and RCA.
