= CT-100 =

Early all-electronic consumer color television

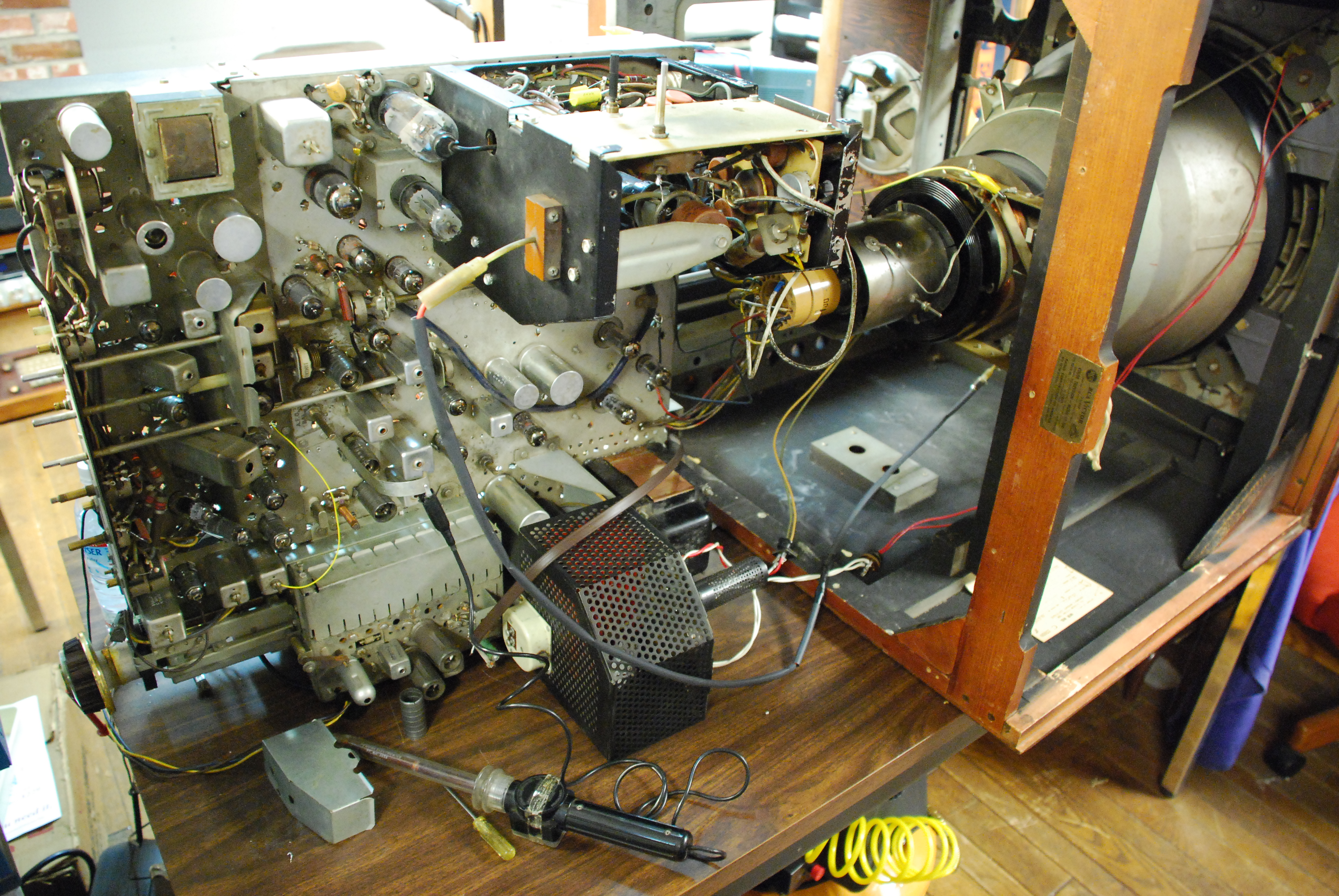
CT-100 with CTC-2 chassis exposed

The CT-100 is an early all-electronic consumer color television set introduced by RCA in April 1954. The color picture tube measures 15 inches diagonally. The viewable picture is just 11½ inches wide. The CT-100 is not the world's first color TV, but it is the first to have been mass produced, with 4,400 having been made.

== Background ==
The world's first color TV set was the Westinghouse H840CK15, released in March 1954, but only 500 were made and only about 30 were sold. The RCA sets were made at RCA's plant in Bloomington, Indiana. The sets cost US$1,000 (equivalent to $11,989 in 2025), half the price of a new low-end automobile. By the end of 1954, RCA released an improved color TV with a 21-inch picture tube.

The CT-100 and its Westinghouse counterpart both suffer from color fringing around the edges of objects on the image.

== Overview ==
The CT-100, which had 36 vacuum tubes in its CTC-2 chassis (known as "Merrill" to the marketing department), was the most complicated electronic device sold to the general public at the time of its release. After initial sales to early adopters, the rest sold poorly, even after a price cut. Many were donated by RCA for training purposes to trade schools and technical colleges, the source of most of today's survivors. RCA sold the CT-100 at a loss. RCA later recalled the CT-100, replacing many of them with a newer 21-inch model.

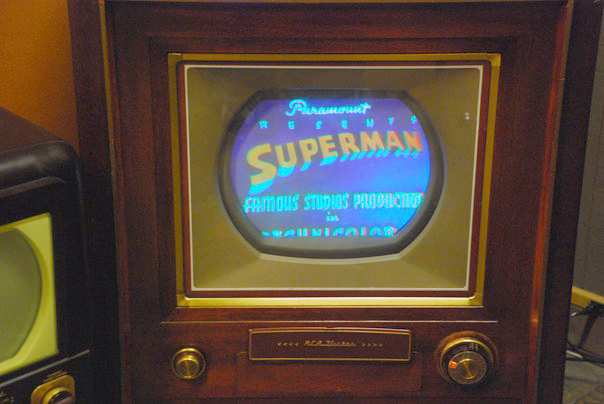
CT-100 at the SPARK Museum of Electrical Invention playing a 1940s Superman cartoon.

Early NBC Living Color programs included An Evening with Fred Astaire. The CT-100 was created in 1954, before the NBC Peacock logo existed. RCA CT-100 sets are extremely sought after by electronics collectors and restorers, with restorers often spending thousands of dollars to obtain or repair a set.

It is believed that RCA only made 4,000 CT-100 receivers. About 150 survive, but only 30 are restored and working. The Early Television Museum in Hilliard, Ohio has a restored and working set on display, as do the SPARK Museum of Electrical Invention in Bellingham, Washington and the Vintage Radio and Communication Museum in Windsor, Connecticut. Collector and YouTuber Spats Bear has a restored and working set in his collection. One reason for the rarity of surviving sets is that the RCA-developed tri-color cathode ray tube (the 15GP22) that was used in the CT-100 was notorious for its glass-to-metal seals breaking down, causing the tube to lose its vacuum. It is extremely rare to find tubes that still work. The 15G was a glass tube, but its high voltage connection is a metal ring between the face of the tube and the glass bell or funnel. This is where the leakage often occurs.
