= Modern Homemakers =

Modern Homemakers is an early American television series. It is the second regularly scheduled series to be broadcast in color, premiering one day after The World Is Yours first aired.

Modern Homemakers debuted on June 27, 1951 on five CBS television network stations in the eastern United States. This half-hour daily daytime program (Monday-Friday, 10:30-11:00 a.m., EDT) was broadcast from New York. Frances Buss was the producer-director for the show.

The show was hosted by home economist Edalene Stohr. For the second episode she prepared a complete fried chicken meal. During its preparation she quipped, "Color television's wonderful, but it will really be something when we develop it to bring you the aromas of the dishes, too."

Because Modern Homemakers was broadcast using CBS's newly-approved (but short-lived) field-sequential color system, the video portion was incompatible with the standard black-and-white television sets of the day. Only a few prototype color television sets existed on which the program could be properly seen. Its final broadcast was on August 17, 1951.
