= Hoffman Television =

Hoffman Television was a manufacturer of television sets in the 1950s and 1960s.

Hoffman Television was part of the first coast-to-coast color broadcast in the United States when NBC telecasted the Tournament of Roses Parade on January 1, 1954, with public demonstrations given across the United States on prototype color receivers by manufacturers RCA, General Electric, Philco, Raytheon, Hallicrafters, Hoffman, Pacific Mercury and others.
