= Hovannes Adamian =

Armenian engineer and television pioneer (1879–1932)

- Հովհաննես Ադամյան
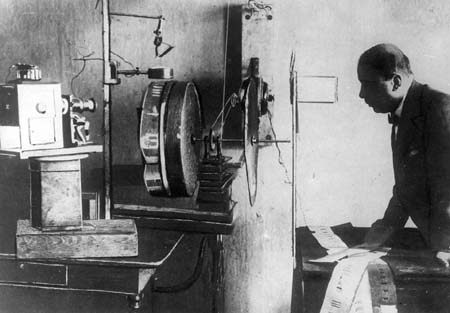
- Adamian c. 1900s
- Born: February 5, 1879; Baku, Russian Empire
- Died: September 12, 1932 (aged 53); Leningrad, Soviet Union
- Known for: Inventor of color television

Hovhannes (Ivan) Abgari Adamian (Russian: Ованес Абгарович Адамян, romanized: Ovanes Abgarovich Adamyan; Armenian: Հովհաննես Աբգարի Ադամյան; 5 February 1879 – 12 September 1932) was an Armenian and Soviet engineer. He was an author of more than 20 inventions. The first experimental color television, shown in London in 1928, was based on Adamian's tricolor principle, and he is recognized as one of the founders of color television.

== Biography ==
Adamian was born in a family of an Armenian merchant and petrol businessman. In 1897, he finished his schooling in Baku and moved to Switzerland. He studied at the universities of Zurich and Berlin. He designed systems of black and white, as well as color televisions. Developing theoretical works by other co-founders of color television like M. Le Blanc and P. Nipkov, Adamian was the first in the world to achieve practical results in color television and to carry out color television transfers. The first color television project is claimed by him, and was patented in Germany on 31 March 1908, patent № 197183, then in Britain, on 1 April 1908, patent № 7219, in France (patent № 390326) and in Russia in 1910 (patent № 17912).

In 1925, in Yerevan, Adamian demonstrated "Eristavi", a device for broadcasting color images. Supported by his friends and assistants from Armenia, he succeeded in demonstrating on a screen a number of color figures and patterns transferred from the laboratory next door.

In 1913, Adamian returned to Saint Petersburg, Russia. He had several long-term trips to Armenia before dying in 1932 in Leningrad. He was buried in the local Armenian cemetery and, in 1970, his remains were brought to Yerevan, to the Pantheon of famous Armenians.
