= The World Is Yours (TV series) =

The World Is Yours is an early television series which was the first regularly scheduled color television program. It made its debut on June 26, 1951 on several CBS network stations in the eastern United States. It was broadcast using CBS's field-sequential method of color broadcasting, a short-lived system which had recently been approved by the FCC.

The World Is Yours was a half-hour daytime program (4:30-5:30 p.m., EDT) hosted from New York by British naturalist and author Ivan T. Sanderson. It aired Monday through Friday, and Mr. Sanderson's assistant was Patricia Stinnette (as "Patty Painter"), a model and CBS employee who had posed for on-camera tests of CBS's color television system since 1946. The producer-director for the show was Frances Buss. The first episode of the series was sponsored by General Mills and included commercials for Betty Crocker cake mixes.

Because it was broadcast using the CBS field-sequential color system, the video was incompatible with standard black-and-white television sets. So only a small number of people who had access to prototype color television sets could properly view the program. The World Is Yours was last broadcast on September 14, 1951, replaced by the Mel Tormé Show, which was also (initially) in color. In October CBS halted its color broadcasts entirely, and in 1953 it officially stated it was no longer interested in its field-sequential color system.
