= List of flat panel display manufacturers =

Flat-panel displays are thin panels of glass or plastic used for electronically displaying text, images, or video. Liquid crystal displays (LCD), OLED (organic light emitting diode) and microLED displays are different kinds of flat panel displays. This is a list of display manufacturers that own and operate cleanroom facilities and specialized equipment for making flat panel displays, including LCD, OLED and microLED displays.

LCD uses a liquid crystal that reacts to an electric current blocking light or allowing it to pass through the panel, whereas OLED/microLED displays consist of electroluminescent organic/inorganic materials that generate light when a current is passed through the material.

LCD, OLED and microLED displays are driven using LTPS, IGZO, LTPO, and A-Si TFT transistor technologies as their backplane using ITO to supply current to the transistors and in turn to the liquid crystal or electroluminescent material. Segment and passive OLED and LC displays (LCDs) do not use a backplane but use indium tin oxide (ITO), a transparent conductive material, to pass current to the electroluminescent material or liquid crystal.

== LCD panel manufacturers ==
Liquid-crystal display (or LCD) is a thin, flat panel used for electronically displaying information such as text, images, and moving pictures. They are usually made of glass but they can also be made out of plastic. Some manufacturers make transparent LCD panels and special sequential color segment LCDs that have higher than usual refresh rates and an RGB backlight. The backlight is synchronized with the display so that the colors will show up as needed. The list of LCD manufacturers:

- (Taiwan) AUO
- (China) BOE (bought Hydis)
- (Japan) Casio (former)
- (Taiwan) ChiMei (former, merged with Innolux)
- (Taiwan) Chunghwa Picture Tubes
- (Taiwan) Giantplus technology
- (Taiwan) HannStar Display Corporation
- (China) HEM
- Hitachi (former, merged with Japan Display alongside Sony and Toshiba)
- (China) HKC
- (Taiwan) InnoLux Corporation
- Japan Display
- (Japan) Kyocera
- (South Korea) LG Display
- (United States) LXD Incorporated
- (Japan) Mitsubishi Electric
- (Japan) NEC Display Solutions (former, now Tianma)
- (Japan) Panasonic Corporation (former)
- (Japan) Pioneer
- (United States) Planar Systems (former)
- (South Korea) Samsung Display (former, formerly (South Korea) / (Japan) S-LCD, a then-joint venture between Samsung Electronics and Sony which Samsung Electronics subsequently bought out Sony's share)
- (Japan) Sharp Corporation
- Sony (former, merged into Japan Display)
- (China) TCL (as CSOT)
- (China) Tianma
- Toshiba (former, merged into Japan Display)
- (Japan) Toshiba Matsushita Display Technology (Dissolved in 2009, bought by Toshiba)

== OLED panel manufacturers ==
Organic light emitting diode (or OLED displays) is a thin, flat panel made of glass or plastic used for electronically displaying information such as text, images, and moving pictures. OLED panels can also take the shape of a light panel, where red, green and blue light emitting materials are stacked to create a white light panel. OLED displays can also be made transparent and/or flexible and these transparent panels are available on the market and are widely used in smartphones with under-display optical fingerprint sensors. LCD and OLED displays are available in different shapes, the most prominent of which is a circular display, which is used in smartwatches. The list of OLED display manufacturers:

- (Taiwan) AUO
- (China) BOE
- China Star Optoelectronics Technology (CSOT)
- (Taiwan) Chunghwa Picture Tubes
- (United States) eMagin
- (China) EverDisplay Optronics
- (Japan) Futaba Corporation (former TDK)
- (Taiwan) InnoLux Corporation
- (South Korea) LG Display
- (Japan) JOLED
- (Japan) Kyocera
- (United States) LXD Incorporated
- (United States) OLEDworks
- (Japan) Pioneer Corporation
- (United States) Planar Systems
- (Taiwan) Ritek (RiT Display)
- (South Korea) Samsung Display
- (Japan) Sony
- (Japan) Sharp Corporation
- (China) Tianma
- (China) Visionox

== MicroLED panel manufacturers ==
MicroLED displays is an emerging flat-panel display technology consisting of arrays of microscopic LEDs forming the individual pixel elements. Like OLED, microLED offers infinite contrast ratio, but unlike OLED, microLED is immune to screen burn-in, and consumes less power while having higher light output, as it uses LEDs instead of organic electroluminescent materials, The list of MicroLED display manufacturers:

- (Taiwan) AUO
- (South Korea) Samsung
- (Japan) Sony
- (China) BOE Technology
- (China) / (Taiwan) Leyard-Epistar Joint venture

Sony produces and sells commercial MicroLED displays called CLEDIS (Crystal-LED Integrated Displays, also called Canvas-LED) in small quantities. Samsung sells a luxury and commercial product called "The Wall", which consists of several microLED display modules tiled together, like in most video walls.

Below are some manufacturers that make MicroLED light panels:

- (United States) Ostendo Technologies, Inc.
- (Taiwan) Luumii
- (United Kingdom) Plessey Semiconductors Ltd

== LCD panel fabrication plants ==
This list lists current LCD fabrication facilities, former facilities are below this first table. LCDs are made in a glass substrate. For OLED, the substrate can also be plastic. The size of the substrates are specified in generations, with each generation using a larger substrate. For example, a 4th generation substrate is larger in size than a 3rd generation substrate. A larger substrate allows for more panels to be cut from a single substrate, or for larger panels to be made, akin to increasing wafer sizes in the semiconductor industry. Panel Inputs per month is how many substrates can a plant process per month.

=== Open ===
Company	Plant name	Plant location	Plant cost (in US$ billions)	Started production	Substrate panel size (in generations)	Process technology (TFT, IPS, LTPS, IGZO, etc.)	Panel inputs per month
Sharp	Taki Mie	Japan		1995			
Sharp	Kameyama	Japan		2004	gen 6, gen 8		
AUO	Longtan	Taiwan		2001, 2003, 2004	gen 4, gen 5		
AUO	Longke	Taiwan		2005	gen 6		
AUO	Guishan	Taiwan		2001, 2003	gen 3.5, gen 5		
Japan Display, JOLED, former Panasonic	Mobara	Japan, Mobara		2006		TFT	
Japan Display	Kaoshiung	Taiwan				IPS	
Japan Display	Tottori	Japan				IPS	
Japan Display	Higashiura	Japan				IPS	
Japan Display	Ishikawa	Japan	1.5	2016		IPS	
BOE	Hefei	China	6.95	2018	gen 10.5	TFT	120,000
BOE	Hefei	China			gen 8.5	TFT	
BOE	Hefei	China			gen 6	TFT	
BOE	Beijing	China			gen 5	TFT	
BOE	Ordos	China			gen 5.5	LTPS	
BOE	Beijing	China			gen 8.5	TFT	
BOE	Chengdu	China			gen 4.5	TFT	
BOE	Fuzhou	China			gen 8.5	TFT	
BOE	Chongqing	China			gen 8.5	TFT	
BOE	Fuqin	China			gen 8.5	TFT	
TCL	Shenzhen	China	9	2019(planned)	gen 11	TFT, IGZO	90,000
TCL					gen 8.5	TFT	
TCL					gen 6	TFT	
MYIR Tech Limited		Shenzhen, China		2019		TFT	
LG Display		South Korea			gen 10.5		
Chunghwa Picture Tubes	Longtan	Taiwan		2002	gen 4.5, gen 6		gen 4.5: 180,000, gen 6: 90,000
Chunghwa Picture Tubes	Yamme	Taiwan			gen 4.5, gen 6		
Giantplus Technology	Bade Plant	Taiwan			gen 3		
Giantplus Technology	Hsinchu Plant	Taiwan			gen 3.5		
Giantplus Technology	Kunshan Giantplus Optronics Display Technology Co., Ltd	China					
Giantplus Technology	Shenzhen Giantplus Optoelectronics Display Co., Ltd.	China					
HannStar Display Corporation	Nanjing Hannstar Plant	Taiwan					
HannStar Display Corporation	Nanjing Hannspree Plant	Taiwan					
HKC		China	1.7	2017	gen 8.6	a-Si	70,000
InnoLux Corporation		Taiwan					
China Star Optoelectronics Technology (CSOT, also known as Shenzhen Huaxing Photoelectric Technology)		China		Under construction	gen 10.5		
China Star Optoelectronics Technology		China	3.5	2010		TFT	140,000
China Star Optoelectronics Technology		China	3.5	2015		a-Si TFT	100,000
China Star Optoelectronics Technology	g11 project, t7	China	6.5	2019	gen 10.5 (gen 11)	a-Si TFT	90,000
China Star Optoelectronics Technology	t6	China	7.25	2019	gen 10.5 (gen 11)	a-Si TFT	90,000

=== Former ===
Company	Plant name	Plant location	Plant cost (in US$ billions)	Started production	Substrate panel size (in generations)	Process technology (TFT, IPS, LTPS, IGZO, etc.)	Panel inputs per month	Ceased Production
Samsung, former S-LCD	Asan	South Korea		2005, 2007	gen 7, gen 8		362,000	Late 2016, turned into amoled production
Chunghwa Picture Tubes	Taoyuan	Taiwan		1973 (as CRT display factory), 1995 (gen 3), 1997 (gen 4)	gen 3, gen 4	TFT	gen 3: 40,000, gen4: 72,600	2015, sold to giantplus and tce photomasks, gen 3 still operated by giantplus, gen 4 line sold to giantplus, equipment sold and line demolished, remainder operated by tce
Panasonic	Himeji	Japan, Himeji		2010	gen 8	TFT		2017, now makes Li-ion batteries

== OLED fabrication plants ==
Only actual plants are listed, former plants should be placed on a table below this one.

Company	Plant name	Plant location	Plant cost (in US$ billions)	Started production	Substrate panel size (in generations)	Process technology (TFT, LTPS, IGZO, LTPO, etc.)	Panel inputs per month
AUO	Singapore	Singapore		2013	gen 4.5		
Samsung	Giheung	South Korea, Gyeonggi-do, Yongin					
Samsung	Chungcheongnamdo, Cheonan	South Korea					
Samsung	Samsung Display Vietnam	Vietnam					
Samsung	Samsung Display Tianjin (SDT)	China, Tianjin					
Samsung	Samsung Display Dongguan (SDD)	China, Guangdong					
Samsung	Samsung Suzhou LCD (SSL), Module (SSM)	China, Jiangsu Province, Suzhou Industry Park, Fengli Street					
Samsung		South Korea, Asan		2018 (planned)			
Samsung	A3	South Korea, Asan?					135,000
Samsung	A5	South Korea, Cheonan?		Under construction			180,000–270,000
Samsung	A4	South Korea, Asan?					45,000 (planned, by the end of 2018)
Samsung	A1	South Korea, Asan					55,000
Samsung	A2	South Korea, Asan					180,000
Samsung	South Chungcheong site	South Korea, South Chungcheong	12.6				
Japan Display	Hakusan	Japan					
Sony	Higashiura	Japan, Aichi					
LG Display	Paju Display Cluster	South Korea, Paju-si, Gyeonggi-do	6.9	2004			70,000
LG Display	P9	South Korea, Paju-si, Gyeonggi-do					70,000
LG Display	E6	South Korea, Paju-si, Gyeonggi-do	1.78	2013	gen 6		70,000
LG Display	E2	South Korea, Paju-si, Gyeonggi-do		2013	gen 4.5		70,000
LG Display	P10	South Korea, Paju-si, Gyeonggi-do	8.71	2018 (planned)	gen 6		70,000
LG Display	E5	South Korea, Gumi		2013	gen 6		7,500
LG Display	Guangzhou	China, Guangzhou	4.2	2019	gen 8.5		60,000
OLEDWorks		Germany, Aachen					
TCL		China, Shenzhen					90,000
TCL		China					
BOE	Ordos	China, Ordos			gen 5.5		
BOE	Chengdu	China, Chengdu		2018	gen 6		
BOE	Sichuan	China, Sichuan					
BOE	Hefei	China, Hefei			gen 8		
BOE	Mianyang	China, Mianyang			gen 6		
BOE	Chongqing	China	$1.5	Under construction	gen 8		
China Star Optoelectronics Technology (CSOT, also known as Shenzhen Huaxing Photoelectric Technology)	Wuhan	China	$5.08	Under construction	gen 6	LTPS AMOLED	45,000
China Star Optoelectronics Technology (CSOT)	Shenzhen	China	$6.7	2021 (planned)	gen 11		
JOLED		Japan, Nomi			gen 4.5	Printed OLED	
JOLED		Japan, Nomi		Under construction	gen 5.5	Printed OLED	
EverDisplay Optronics		China		2014	gen 4.5		20,000
EverDisplay Optronics	Shanghai	China	$4.1	2018	gen 6		30,000
Tianma		China			gen 5.5		
Tianma	Wuhan	China		2017	gen 6		
Tianma	Xiamen	China		Under construction	gen 6		30,000
Visionox	Hebei	China	$4.5	2018	gen 6		30,000
Visionox	Guangzhou	China	$6.3	Under construction	gen 6		30,000

== MicroLED fabrication plants ==
Only actual plants are listed, former plants should be placed on a table below this one.

Company	Plant name	Plant location	Plant cost (in US$ billions)	Started production	Substrate panel size (in generations)	Process technology (TFT, LTPS, IGZO, LTPO, etc.)	Panel inputs per month
AUO	Longtan	Longtan, Taiwan		since 2018	4.5 (latest generation in 2025)	(patented)	>100,000 (start 2025)
Luumii	Suzhou	Suzhou, China		2019			40,000 (increasing to 100,000 by the end of 2019)
Leyard-Epistar		Wuxi, China	0.143	2023(under construction)			
Plessey Semiconductors Ltd	Plessey Semiconductors Ltd	Roborough, Plymouth, United Kingdom		2018			

== See also ==
- Liquid-crystal display (LCD)
  - TFT LCD
  - LED-backlit Display
  - Mini LED Display
- Organic Light-Emitting Diode (OLED)
  - AMOLED
- MicroLED
