= Next generation of display technology =

Type of display technology

Next generation of display technology is any display technology considered likely to outperform current display technologies like LCD or OLED.

== List of next generation display technologies ==
Display technology	Companies involved	Status
Organic light-emitting transistor (OLET)	Polyera & Institute for Nanostructured Materials	
Surface-conduction electron-emitter display (SED)	Canon & Toshiba	On 18 August 2010, Canon decided to liquidate SED Inc., a consolidated subsidiary of Canon Inc. developing SED technology, citing difficulties to secure appropriate profitability and effectively ending hopes to one day see SED TVs in the living room.
Field emission display (FED)	Sony, Motorola, AU Optronics	In January 2010, Taiwanese AU Optronics Corporation (AUO) announced that it had acquired assets from Sony's FET and FET Japan, including "patents, know-how, inventions, and relevant equipment related to FED technology and materials". In November 2010, Nikkei reported that AUO plans to start mass production of FED panels in the fourth quarter of 2011, however AUO commented that the technology is still in the research stage and there are no plans to begin mass production at this moment.
Laser TV (Quantum dot, Liquid crystal)	Arasor, Mitsubishi, HDI 3D	On January 7, 2008, at an event associated with the Consumer Electronics Show 2008, Mitsubishi Digital Electronics America, a key player in high-performance red-laser and large-screen HDTV markets, unveiled their first commercial Laser TV, a 65" 1080p model. This Laser TV, branded "Mitsubishi LaserVue TV", went on sale, November 16, 2008 for $6,999.
MEMS display (iMoD, TMOS, DMS)	Qualcomm (iMoD), UniPixel (TMOS), Pixtronix (DMS), tMt, Texas Instruments	IMOD displays are now available in the commercial marketplace. QMT's displays, using IMOD technology, are found in the Acoustic Research ARWH1 Stereo Bluetooth headset device, the Showcare Monitoring system (Korea), the Hisense C108, and mp3 applications from Freestyle Audio and Skullcandy. In the mobile phone marketplace, Taiwanese manufacturers Inventec and Cal-Comp have announced phones with Mirasol displays, and LG claims to be developing 'one or more' handsets using Mirasol technology. These products all have only 2-color (black plus one other) "bi-chromic" displays. UniPixel's TMOS and Pixtronix's DMS display technologies utilize vertically and horizontally moving MEMS structures to modulate a backlight, respectively.
Ferro liquid display (FLD)	LG & Philips, Micron Technology, Forth Dimension Displays	Some commercial products do seem to utilize FLCD.
Thick-film dielectric electroluminescent (TDEL)	iFire Technology	By the end of 2008, iFire Technology was sold by Westaim to a Canadian-Chinese joint venture, CTS Group. Further developments are now awaited.
Telescopic pixel display (TPD)	Microsoft & University of Washington	The technology is still in its nascent stages, and the project is unusual for Microsoft, which is not in the display business. There is a possibility that Microsoft will collaborate with a display manufacturer, but commercial production will not begin until at least 2013.
Laser phosphor display (LPD)	Prysm	On 25 February 2011, Prysm announced that its high-definition stackable display tiles, powered by its Laser Phosphor Display (LPD) technology, are now available for shipping to customers.
MicroLED	Apple, Sony, Samsung, Tianma, PlayNitride, Plessey Semiconductors Ltd, Ostendo Technologies, Inc.	Although MicroLED displays have not been mass-produced for home use, after pioneering the technology in 2012, Sony released its MicroLED modular displays, Crystal LED, targeting residential configurations in September 2019, following the successful commercialization of its wall-sized version for commercial and business use, with resolutions of up to 16K. Other manufacturers have also demonstrated prototypes, like Samsung's "The Wall" at CES in 2019, using a similar concept to Sony CLEDIS presented in 2016, ahead of InfoComm 2016. Apple has begun in-house development of microLED screens of its own. At SID's Display Week 2019 in May, Tianma and PlayNitride demonstrated their co-developed 7.56” microLED display with over 60% transparency. China Star Optoelectronics Technology (CSoT) demonstrated a 3.3" transparent microLED display with around 45% transparency, also co-developed with PlayNitride. Plessey Semiconductors Ltd demonstrated a GaN-on-Silicon wafer to CMOS backplane wafer bonded native Blue monochrome 0.7" active-matrix microLED display with an 8-micron pixel pitch. Ostendo Technologies, Inc. demonstrated a vertically integrated LED that can emit light from red to blue, including white – from a monolithic InGaN-based LED device.
Quantum dot display (QD-LED)/ Electroluminescent quantum dots (ELQD, QDLE, EL-QLED)/ AMQLED	Samsung, Sony, NanoPhotonica, Nanosys	Many expect that quantum dot display technology can compete or even replace liquid crystal displays (LCDs) in near future, including the desktop and notebook computer spaces and televisions. These initial applications alone represent more than a $8-billion addressable market by 2023 for quantum dot-based components. Other than display applications, several companies are manufacturing QD-LED light bulbs; these promise greater energy efficiency and longer lifetime.
