= LG Philips =

LG Philips can refer to two partnerships between South Korea's LG Group and the Dutch firm Philips:

- LG Philips Display
- LG.Philips LCD
