= Sony Mobile Display =

Subsidiary of Sony Corporation

Sony Mobile Display Corporation
- Company type: Subsidiary
- Founded: October 22, 1997
- Defunct: March 31, 2012
- Fate: Merged
- Successor: Japan Display Inc.
- Headquarters: Higashiura, Aichi, Japan
- Products: Low-temperature polysilicon TFT-LCD, Amorphous silicon TFT-LCD, Organic EL displays and Touch screens
- Services: Design, development, manufacturing and sale of small and midsize displays
- Number of employees: 2,500 (July 2010)
- Parent: Sony: 100% (as of March 31, 2012)

Sony Mobile Display Corporation was a subsidiary of Sony Corporation and produced Low-temperature polysilicon, amorphous silicon TFT LCD panels, organic EL displays and touch screens for use in mobile products such as camcorders, digital cameras, mobile phones, automobiles, etc. Its manufacturing plants were located in Higashiura, Aichi and Tottori, Tottori, Japan. The business of the company was transferred to Japan Display Inc. on April 1, 2012.

== History ==
On October 22, 1997, ST Liquid Crystal Display Corporation (STLCD), a 50:50 joint venture between Sony Corporation and Toyota Industries Corporation, was established in Higashiura, Aichi, Japan. On March 31, 2005, Sony and Toyota Industries acquired International Display Technology Corporation (IDTech) and renamed it to ST Mobile Display Corporation (STMD).

== Recent history ==
On December 1, 2007, STLCD and STMD were merged to form Sony Mobile Display Corporation. On June 30, 2009, Epson and Sony agreed to transfer certain business assets relating to small-and medium-sized TFT LCD operations. On June 1, 2010, Sony Mobile Display sold the Yasu plant to Kyocera Corporation.

On August 31, 2011, Innovation Network Corporation of Japan (INCJ), Hitachi, Sony and Toshiba announced that Hitachi Displays, Sony Mobile Display and Toshiba Mobile Display will be merged to form a new company called Japan Display Inc. (INCJ 70%, Hitachi 10%, Sony 10%, Toshiba 10%).

On April 1, 2012, the company became a wholly owned subsidiary of Japan Display and renamed Japan Display West Inc.

On April 1, 2013, Japan Display West (formerly Sony Mobile Display), Japan Display Central (formerly Toshiba Mobile Display), and Japan Display East (formerly Hitachi Displays) were merged into Japan Display.

== See also ==
- S-LCD
- Sony Group
