= DFC =

DFC may refer to:

== Arts and entertainment ==
- DFC (group), an American hip hop duo
- The DFC, a 2008/2009 British children's comic
- Dreamfall Chapters: The Longest Journey, a 2017 video game (DfC)
- Dysfunctional Family Circus, various parody comics
- Discovery Family Channel, an American television network

== Association football ==
- Damolly F.C., Northern Ireland
- Darlington F.C., County Durham, England
- Dartford F.C., Kent, England
- Dergview F.C., Northern Ireland
- Desertmartin F.C., Northern Ireland
- DFC Prag, Czech Republic
- Dollingstown F.C., Northern Ireland
- Donacloney F.C., Northern Ireland
- Donaghadee F.C., Northern Ireland
- Dordrechtse Football Club, Netherlands (now FC Dordrecht)
- Dorking F.C., Surrey, England
- Dumbarton F.C., Scotland
- Dundee F.C., Scotland
- Dundela F.C., Northern Ireland
- Dundonald F.C., Northern Ireland
- Dunloy F.C., Northern Ireland
- Dunnaman F.C., Northern Ireland
- Danubio F.C., Uruguay

== Government and military ==
- U.S. International Development Finance Corporation (DFC), United States
- Department for Communities, Northern Ireland, UK
- Distinguished Flying Cross (United Kingdom), a medal
- Distinguished Flying Cross (United States), a medal
- Dedicated freight corridors in India, an Indian rail network
- DFC New Zealand Limited

== Science and technology ==
- DFC (cipher), decorrelated fast cipher
- Dfc, one of six sub-classifications for subarctic climate (and by far the most common)
- Digital Film Console, made by AMS Neve
- Digital Fine Contrast

== Other uses ==
- Digital Future Coalition, an American copyright advocacy group
- Design for Cost, see Design for X
