= Taiwan Corporate Sustainability Awards =

Award in Taiwan

The Taiwan Corporate Sustainability Awards (TCSA; Chinese: 台灣企業永續獎; pinyin: Táiwān Qǐyè Yǒngxù Jiǎng) is a corporate sustainability award in Taiwan. It awards outstanding Taiwanese companies and foreign companies operating in Taiwan for their contribution to sustainability. The award is hosted by the Taiwan Institute for Sustainable Energy.

== History ==
The award was firstly held in 2008.

Sequence	Date	Winners	Theme/Remark
1st	2008	Manufacturing: Tatung Co./AU Optronics Co./United Microelectronics Co Non-Manufacturing: Chunghwa Telecom Co., Ltd./CTCI Co.	
2nd	November 2009	Manufacturing :-Gold Medal-TSMC/United Microelectronics Silver Medal-AU Optronics Co./Chi Mei Optoelectronics Co Bronze Medal-CHC Resources Co./Innolux Co. Non-Manufacturing :-Gold Medal-Chunghwa Telecom Co., Ltd. Silver Medal-Uni-President Enterprises Co. Bronze Medal-Taiwan Power Co.	
3rd	2010	Large Manufacturer :-Gold Medal-TSMC Silver Medal-United Microelectronics Co. Bronze Medal-AU Optronics Co. Large Service Firms :-Gold Medal-Chunghwa Telecom Co., Ltd. Silver Medal-Taiwan Power Co. Bronze Medal-CTCI Co./Sinyi Realty Co. Small and Medium-sized Enterprise :- Silver Medal-CHC Resources Co. Non-profit Organizations :-Taipei Medial University Hospital/Southern Taiwan Science Industrial Park	
4th			
5th			
6th	29 November 2013		
7th	25 November 2014		
8th	24 November 2015		
9th			

== See also ==
- Sustainability
- SDG Asia
