= HannStar Display Corporation =

Taiwan-based technology company

Hannstar Display Corporation 瀚宇彩晶股份有限公司
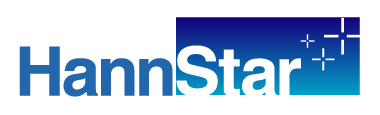
- Type: Public
- Industry: Display technology
- Founded: 1998; 28 years ago
- Headquarters: Taipei, Taiwan
- Key people: Yu-Chi Chiao (Chairman and CEO)
- Products: LCD monitors, televisions
- Number of employees: 4,500 (2007)
- Website: http://www.hannstar.com/

HannStar Display Corporation
- Chinese: 瀚宇彩晶
Transcriptions
Standard Mandarin
- Hanyu Pinyin: Hànyǔ Caǐjīng

HannStar Display Corporation (Chinese: 瀚宇彩晶股份有限公司; pinyin: Hànyǔ Cǎijīng Gǔfèn Yǒuxiàn Gōngsī) is a Taiwan-based technology company, primarily involved in the research and production of monitors, notebook displays, and televisions.

== Overview ==
Founded in June 1998, HannStar produces products under the following brand names:

- Hannstar (LCD monitors)
- Hannspree (LCD monitors, netbooks, laptops, tablet computers, all-in-one desktop computers, and televisions)
- Hanns·G (Gaming monitors)
- I-INC (LCD monitors)

The company has one LCD fabrication facility and one liquid-crystal module (LCM) fabrication facility. Through technology transfer from Hitachi and Toshiba, the company acquired TFT LCD manufacturing technology. It became listed on the Taiwan Stock Exchange in September 2004.

HannStar is, with Quanta, one of two companies manufacturing the most laptop motherboards all over the world for computer manufacturers like Hewlett-Packard, Acer Group (Acer, Packard Bell, e-Machines, Gateway), Toshiba, Dell and Sony.

== History ==
In December 2010, the EU fined Hannstar for its part in a price fixing scheme. The company was fined €8.1 million of the total €648.9 million fined against a group of companies, including Chimei InnoLux, LG Display, AU Optronics, and Chunghwa Picture Tubes Ltd.

== See also ==
- List of companies of Taiwan
