= TMOS =

TMOS may refer to:

- Tetramethyl orthosilicate
- The Mike O'Meara Show
- Time-multiplexed optical shutter
- TMOS, an operating system used in the BIG-IP products by F5 Networks
- Trench-MOS
- Australian Research Council Centre of Excellence for Transformative Meta-Optical Systems (TMOS)
