= Bilbobus =

Metropolitan bus services in Bilbao, Spain

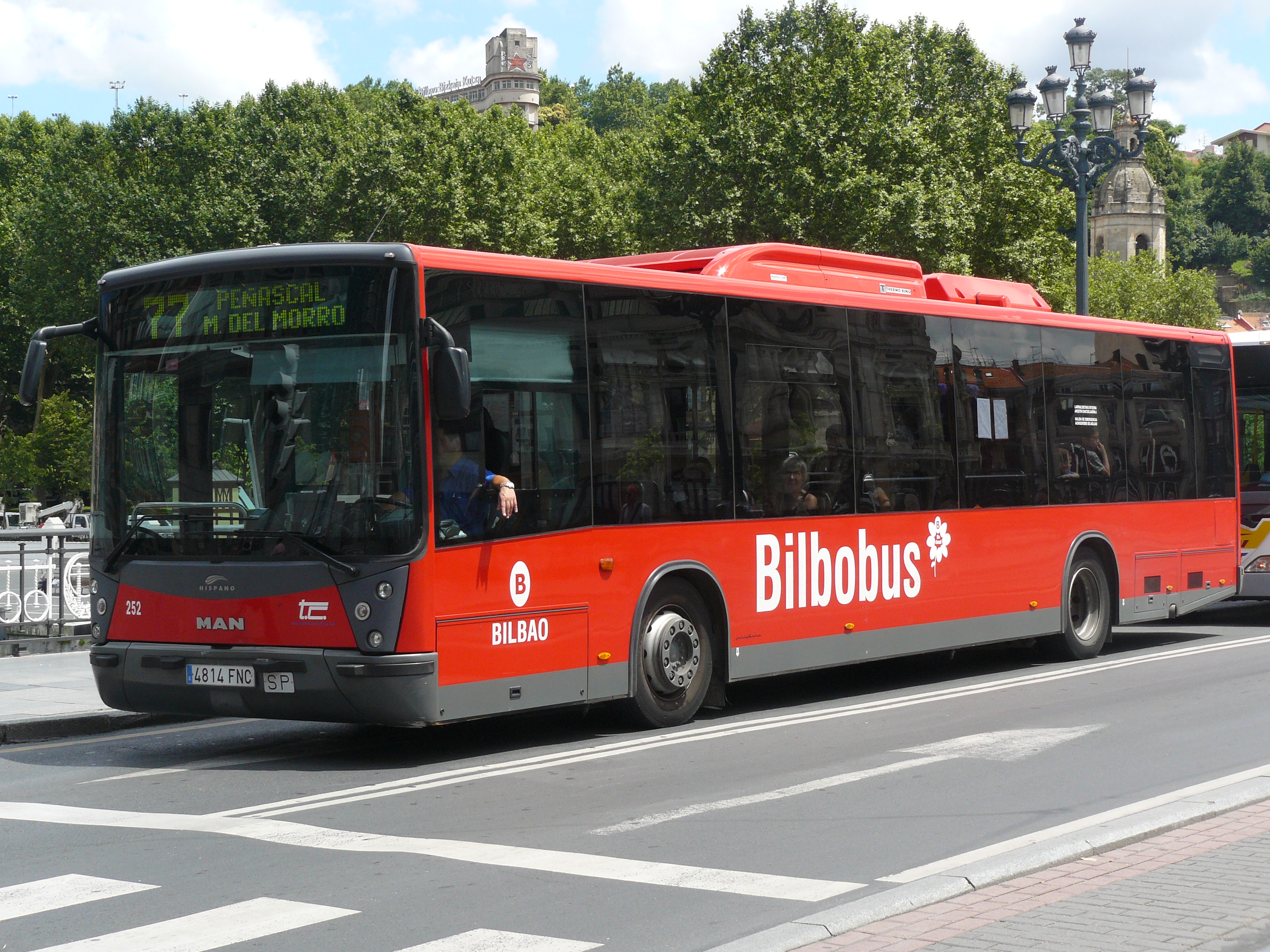
- A Bilbobus unit in Bilbao
- Founded: 1988
- Service type: bus service
- Routes: 45 (37 daytime and 8 night lines)
- Operator: BioBide
- Website: Bilbobus

== Bilbobus ==
(Named after the Basque toponym for the city: Bilbo) is the urban public transport service of the city of Bilbao. The current service was established in 1988 as an initiative by the Bilbao City Council to unify and reorganize the city's transport, which until then had been managed by the company TUGBSA (Transportes Urbanos del Gran Bilbao S.A.). The history of its concessionaires reflects the evolution of the sector:

- TCSA (1988–2008): The first operator of the Bilbobus era, maintaining the legacy of the old red buses and the iconic blue microbuses known as "azulitos."
- Veolia (2008–2012): The French multinational took over the service in 2008, marking the first change in management in decades.
- BioBide (2012–Present): Since May 2012, the company (formed by Alsa and Transitia) has managed the service, consolidating its current modernization.

As of early 2026, the network features a fleet of 143 vehicles with an average age of just 4.90 years, distinguished by their solid red color and the municipal logo (the letter B) above the doors. The service is in an advanced stage of transitioning to zero emissions, focusing on electric and hybrid technology to cover its 45 lines (28 regular, 9 Auzolineak, and 8 night or Gautxori lines). Although the service scope is municipal, it maintains excellent intermodality with Bizkaibus, the Bilbao Metro, Euskotren Trena, the Bilbao tram, and Cercanías Bilbao, even reaching neighborhoods in neighboring municipalities such as Ollargan (Arrigorriaga), Zubileta (Barakaldo), and Enekuri (Erandio). After overcoming the ridership crisis caused by the arrival of the Metro in 1995, Bilbobus reached a historic record in 2025 with nearly 30 million passengers, maintaining a citizen satisfaction rating of 8.07 points. Annually, its units travel over 6.3 million kilometers at an average speed of 14.7 km/h, establishing itself as the heart of urban mobility in the city.

=== History, Analysis, and Evolution of the Service ===
Since its municipalization in 1988, Bilbobus has been the heir to a transport tradition dating back over 130 years in the city. Under different names, TCSA (and formerly TUGBSA) operated pioneering milestones in Spain, such as the first electric tram in 1896, the first trolleybuses in 1940, and the emblematic blue microbuses or "azulitos" in 1960. After the unification of the brand, Bilbobus held the exclusivity of urban transport until the inauguration of the Metro in 1995, at which point the service began to evolve to complement the high-capacity network. The management and identity of the service have passed through several key stages:

- Management Evolution:
- TCSA operated the service under the Bilbobus brand until 2008, when the multinational Veolia took over the concession. In 2012, due to economic difficulties, Veolia transferred the contract to BioBide (Alsa and Transitia), which manages the service today.
- Operational Milestones:
- In 2013, advertising was introduced on buses for the first time (managed by Comunitat).
- In 2018, the "on-demand" intermediate stop service was implemented for Gautxoris (Night Service):
- Fridays: From 10:00 PM to 02:00 AM.
- Saturdays: From 10:00 PM to 07:00 AM (uninterrupted service).

This measure was implemented to improve the safety of female users.

- Sustainability and Technology:
- The service currently highlights the Medusa Project, a pioneering system in Elorrieta that uses recovered energy from Metro Bilbao to charge electric buses, saving 426 tons of CO₂ annually. Between 2024 and 2025, a deep fleet renovation was completed, reaching 26 pure electric units.

Currently, Bilbobus guarantees that 99.8% of the population resides within 300 meters of a stop. With over 100,000 daily trips, the majority profile of the user is female (70%), and the primary reason for travel is work-related (44%). Lines 77 and 56 are established as the most used, each exceeding 2 million annual passengers. The service holds a high citizen rating (7.32/10), with the Gautxori being the best-rated, and remains competitive as the City Council subsidizes 70% of its cost. In 2025, the service reached its peak, hitting a historic record of nearly 30 million travelers.

Annual passenger evolution (Official CTB data)
Year	Passengers	% Var.	Historical Context
1988	31,300,000	—	Pre-metro historical peak
1995	29,150,000	▼2.1%	Opening of Metro Line 1
2002	27,100,000	▼1.4%	Opening of the Tramway
2017	25,480,000	▼1.6%	Opening of Metro Line 3
2020	13,600,000	▼44%	COVID-19 pandemic
2023	25,900,000	▲23%	50% fare discount
2025	29,554,323	▲13%	2025 annual closing data

== Daytime Lines ==
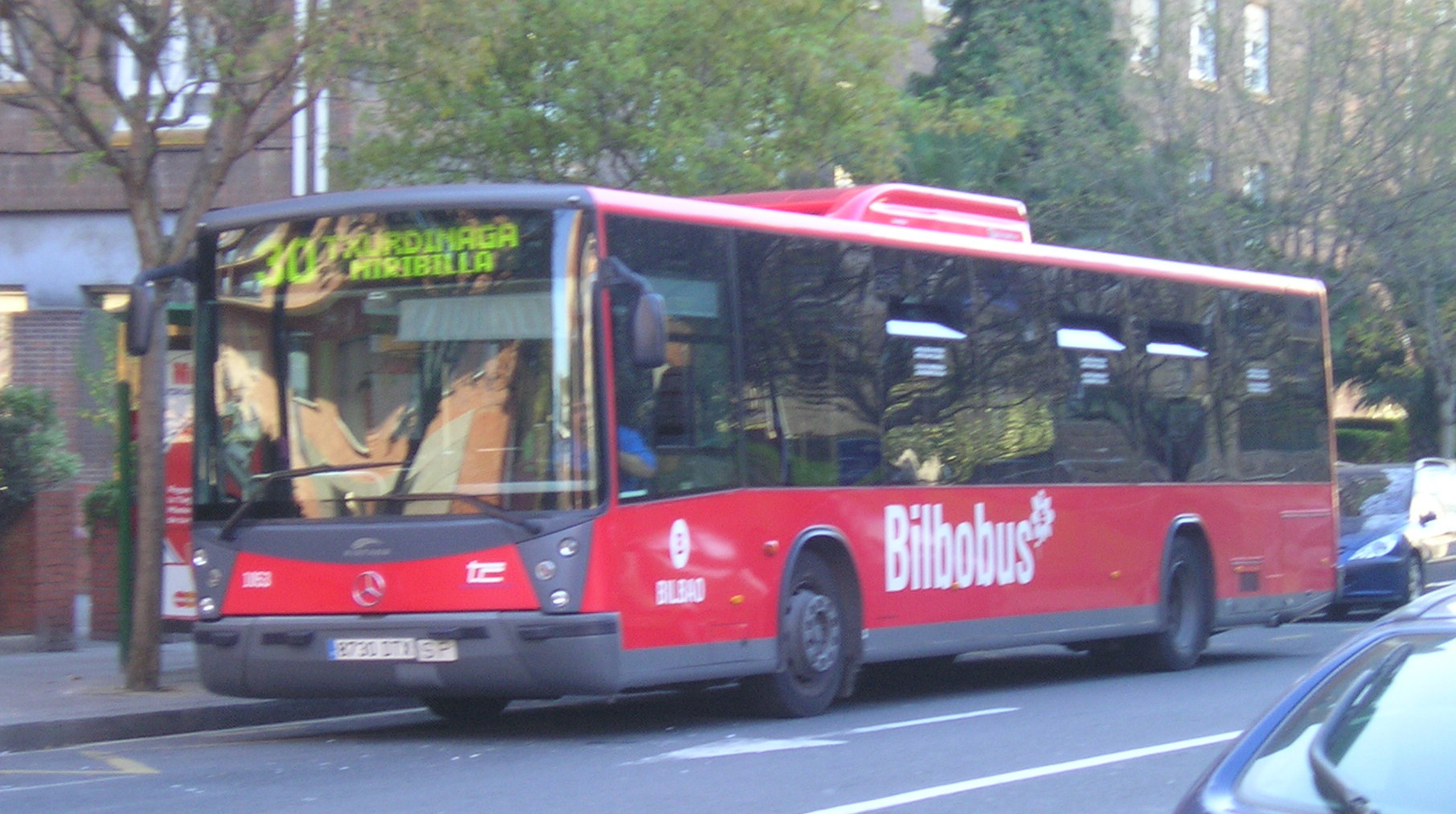
Bilbobus in the neighbourhood of Txurdinaga.

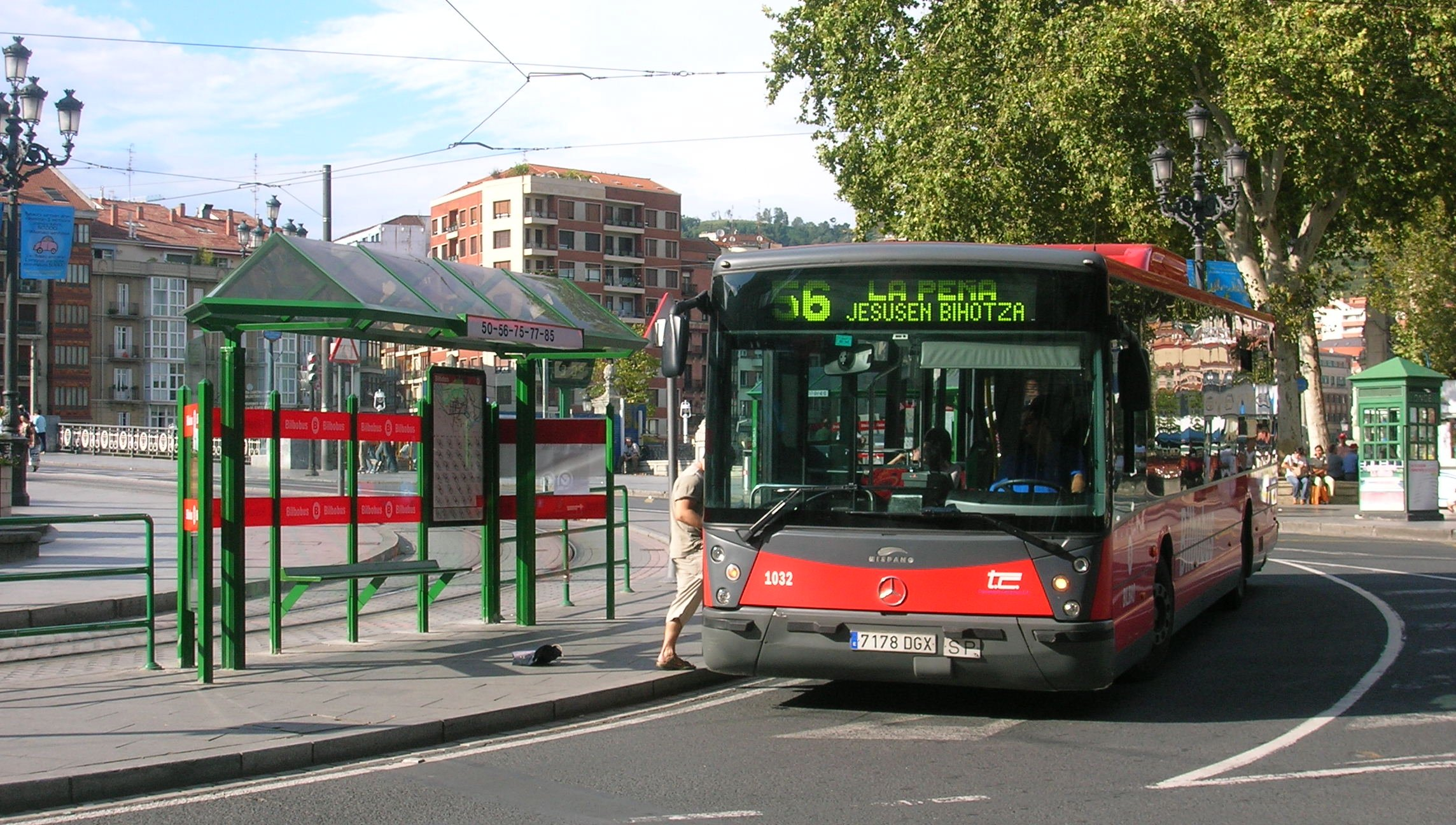
Line 56 bus, the most used line.

Currently, the network consists of 37 daytime lines, divided into 28 regular lines (identified by numbers) and 9 Auzolinea lines (identified by the letter A). Most main lines start staggered between 05:15 AM and 07:00 AM, with A8 being the last to start at 08:00 AM. Daytime service mostly ends between 10:00 PM and 11:00 PM. However, Line 30 is the latest to finish, extending its last trip until 11:40 PM.

Line	Route	Weekday Freq.	Holiday Freq.	Duration	Type (Length)
01	Arangoiti - Plaza Circular	15 min	30 min	25 min	Standard (12m)
03	Plaza Circular - Otxarkoaga	10 min	15 min	20 min	Standard (12m)
10	Elorrieta - Plaza Circular	15 min	30 min	30 min	Standard (12m)
11	Deusto - Bilbao La Vieja	20 min	30 min	25 min	Midibus (8.9m)
13	San Ignacio - Txurdinaga	15 min	30 min	40 min	Standard (12m)
18	San Ignacio - Zorroza	15 min	30 min	35 min	Standard (12m)
22	Sarrikue - Atxuri	15 min	20 min	20 min	Midibus (10.6m)
27	Arabella - Betolaza	15 min	30 min	45 min	Standard (12m)
28	Uribarri - Altamira	15 min	20 min	35 min	Standard (12m)
30	Txurdinaga - Miribilla	15 min	20 min	30 min	Standard (12m)
34	Otxarkoaga - Santutxu	30 min	30 min	15 min	Midibus (10.6m)
38	Otxarkoaga - Intermodal	15 min	20 min	40 min	Standard (12m)
40	La Peña - Plaza Circular	15 min	20 min	20 min	Standard (12m)
43	Garaizar - Santutxu	30 min	30 min	15 min	Midibus (8.9m)
48	Santutxu - Lezeaga	15 min	20 min	40 min	Standard (12m)
50	Buia - Plaza Circular	60 min	60 min	15 min	Midibus (10.6m)
55	Miribilla - Mina del Morro	60 min	60 min	25 min	Midibus (10.6m)
56	La Peña - Sagrado Corazón	10 min	15 min	25 min	Standard (12m)
57	Miribilla - Basurto Hospital	60 min	-	20 min	Midibus (10.6m)
58	Monte Caramelo - Atxuri	15 min	20 min	35 min	Standard (12m)
62	Sagrado Corazón - Arabella	20 min	30 min	25 min	Standard (12m)
71	Miribilla - San Ignacio	15 min	20 min	35 min	Standard (12m)
72	Larraskitu - Castaños	15 min	20 min	30 min	Standard (12m)
75	San Adrián - Atxuri	15 min	20 min	20 min	Midibus (10.6m)
76	Artazu/Xalbador - Plaza Elíptica	20 min	30 min	25 min	Midibus (8.9m)
77	Peñascal - Mina del Morro	12 min	20 min	35 min	Standard (12m)
85	Siete Campas - Atxuri	20 min	40 min	35 min	Standard (12m)
88	Castrejana - Indauchu	60 min	60 min	25 min	Standard (12m)
A1	Asunción - Plaza Circular	60 min	60 min	15 min	Microbus (8m)
A2	Solokoetxe - Plaza Circular	30 min	30 min	10 min	Microbus (8m)
A3	Olabeaga - Plaza Elíptica	30 min	60 min	15 min	Microbus (8m)
A4	Zorrotzaurre - Deusto	20 min	20 min	15 min	Microbus (8m)
A5	Prim - Plaza Circular	30 min	30 min	15 min	Microbus (8m)
A6	Arangoiti - Deusto	15 min	30 min	20 min	Standard (12m)
A7	Artxanda - Arenal	60 min	60 min	20 min	Midibus (10.6m)
A8	San Justo - Amezola	60 min	60 min	15 min	Microbus (8m)
A9	Santa Marina Hospital - Abando	60 min	60 min	15 min	Standard (12m)

== Gautxori (Night Services) ==
The Bilbobus night service, known as Gautxori, ensures mobility in the city during weekend nights. It is one of the highest-rated services by citizens, achieving a score of 7.4/10 in satisfaction surveys. Its operations follow these schedules:

- Fridays: From 10:00 PM to 02:00 AM.
- Saturdays: From 10:00 PM to 07:00 AM (uninterrupted service).

A fundamental feature of this service is that cash payments (single tickets) are not accepted; access must be made exclusively via the barik smart card. All Gautxori lines have their terminus or hub at Plaza Circular, facilitating connections between the city center and the neighborhoods.

Line	Route	Friday Freq.	Saturday Freq.	Vehicle Type
G1	Arabella - Plaza Circular	30 min	30 min	Standard (12m)
G2	Otxarkoaga - Plaza Circular	30 min	30 min	Standard (12m)
G3	Larraskitu - Plaza Circular	30 min	30 min	Standard (12m)
G4	La Peña - Plaza Circular	30 min	30 min	Standard (12m)
G5	San Adrián/Miribilla - Plaza Circular	30 min	30 min	Standard (12m)
G6	Altamira/Zorroza - Plaza Circular	30 min	30 min	Standard (12m)
G7	Mina del Morro - Plaza Circular	30 min	30 min	Standard (12m)
G8	Arangoiti - Plaza Circular	30 min	30 min	Standard (12m)

== Special Services and Lines ==
Bilbobus activates specific transport protocols to respond to mass events, sports competitions, or transport network contingencies. These lines, generally identified by the letter E (Especial), connect the city's key points with the main leisure and sports venues.

=== Aste Nagusia (Great Week) ===
During the city's patron saint festivities, the service adapts to absorb high night mobility demand (with peaks of up to half a million trips during the festive period):

- Continuous Gautxori: The night service operates uninterrupted (from 10:00 PM to 07:00 AM) from the first Saturday to the second Saturday of the festivities. On the final Sunday, the night service ends at 02:00 AM.
- Payment Restriction: Following night service regulations, payment is made only via the barik card; cash is not accepted.

=== Sports and Cultural Events ===
The deployment of special lines ensures the orderly exit of the city's major venues:

- Football (Athletic Club): When matches at the San Mamés Stadium conclude after 10:00 PM, reinforcement lines E38, E56, E57, and E62 are activated, along with E28 (in both directions). This special operation manages an approximate flow of 45,000 annual users.
- Bilbao Arena (Basketball and Concerts): For events at the Miribilla venue, line E7 establishes a direct shuttle with Abando station. Additionally, conventional lines 30, 71, 75, and 76 enable a temporary stop next to the arena.
- Frontón Bizkaia: During Basque pelota festivals, line E2 connects the center (Abando) with the Miribilla facilities.

=== Funicular Contingencies ===
- Technical Substitution: During periods of scheduled maintenance or breakdown of the Artxanda Funicular, the special E5 comes into operation. This service runs the route between the Castaños neighborhood and Mount Artxanda.

== Payment System and Fares ==
The Bilbobus payment system is fully integrated into the Consorcio de Transportes de Bizkaia (CTB). Since February 1, 2026, fares remain subsidized to encourage public transport use, with the barik smart card as the primary medium.

Official Bilbobus Fares (Feb. 2026 Update)
Transport Title	Medium	Base Fare	Subsidized Fare	Observations
Single Ticket	QR / Paper	€1.70	—	No transfers allowed.
barik Card (Creditrans)	Barik Card	€0.73	€0.44	Allows free transfer (45 min).
Bilbotrans / Gizatrans	Personalized Barik	€0.36	€0.22	Specific groups and social profile.
Hirukotrans (F20)	Personalized Barik	€0.58	€0.35	General category large family.
Hirukotrans (F50)	Personalized Barik	€0.36	€0.22	Special category large family.
Under 15s	Personalized Barik	Free	Free	Measure in effect since July 2025.
On-board fine	—	€50.00	—	Penalty for traveling without a valid title.

=== Payment Considerations ===
- Transfers: Transfers between two Bilbobus lines are free as long as they are made within 45 minutes and using a Barik card.
- Current Discounts: The final price paid by the user (bold column) includes the bonus applied by institutions on multi-trip titles.
- Gautxori and Special Services: In night and special fair services, the single ticket is invalid; the use of the Barik card is mandatory.
- Gazte Bio: Users under 26 have an additional 50% discount on personalized youth passes.

=== Barik Card ===
Anonymous Barik card.

The Barik card is the contactless medium issued by the CTB. It costs €3 and comes in three modalities:

- Anonymous Barik (white): For Creditrans use. Can be personalized later.
- Personalized Barik Kide (white): Required for titles with specific discounts like Hirukotrans, Gazte Bio, or Bilbotrans.
- Personalized Barik Giza (red): Specifically for the Gizatrans title (social profile and seniors over 65).

=== Customer Service Points ===
Personalized cards can be processed at the Customer Service Points (PAC) in:

- Bilbao: Licenciado Poza 6 (Bilbobus), San Mamés, Casco Viejo, Abando, and Atxuri.
- Other points: Ansio, Areeta, Durango, Portugalete, Sodupe, and the UPV/EHU Campus (Leioa).

== Fleet: Technology and Sustainability ==
The Bilbobus fleet is undergoing constant renewal, currently operating with a total of 143 vehicles with an average age of 4.90 years, one of the lowest in Spain. Within the framework of the Bilbao City Council's strategic plan for sustainable mobility and decarbonization, 85% of the fleet has ECO or Zero Emissions environmental labels, prioritizing the gradual replacement of combustion engines with clean technologies.

Regarding equipment and technology, the service stands out for the following standards:

- Accessibility: 100% of the fleet is fully accessible, featuring low floors, motorized ramps, and kneeling systems to facilitate access for people with reduced mobility.
- Connectivity and Comfort: Units integrate passenger information multimedia screens, free Wi-Fi systems, and USB chargers.
- Fleet Management: All vehicles are monitored in real-time via a GPS-based Operation Support System (SAE).

Current Bilbobus Fleet (2026)
Manufacturer	Model	Length	Year	Series	Units	Type
Mercedes-Benz	Citaro C2	12.1 m	2014–2016	601, 605–617	14	Diesel (Euro VI)
Irizar	ie2	12 m	2016–2019	700–705	6	Electric
Mercedes-Benz	Sprinter W906	7.3 m	2017	9–11	3	Diesel
Mercedes-Benz	Citaro C2 K	10.6 m	2017–2018	900–904	5	Diesel (Euro VI)
Mercedes-Benz	Citaro C2 Hybrid	12.1 m	2018–2022	751–819	69	Hybrid
Mercedes-Benz	Citaro C2 K Hybrid	10.6 m	2019–2023	905–929	25	Hybrid
Solaris	Urbino 8.9 LE electric	8.9 m	2020	730	1	Electric
Solaris	Urbino 12 electric	12 m	2020–2022	720–723	4	Electric
Irizar	ie Tram	12 m	2021–2022	706–711	6	Electric
Karsan	ATAK electric	8.3 m	2022	20	1	Electric
Mercedes-Benz	eCitaro	12.1 m	2024	740–742	3	Electric
MAN	Lion's City 10 E	10.5 m	2024	731	1	Electric
MAN	Lion's City 12 E	12.2 m	2025–2026	743–746	4	Electric
			TOTAL		143	

=== Historical Fleet Units ===
This table lists the history of vehicles that have provided regular service in the fleet and are currently listed as **WITHDRAWN**, ordered chronologically from the oldest models.

Historical Withdrawals (Chronological Order)
Series	Chassis	Bodywork	Observations	Years
651 / 654	Pegaso 5081	Van Hool	Units from TUGBSA / TCSA.	1980–1985
1209 / 1573	Pegaso 5024 / 5023	Maiso / Van Hool	Historical units from former concessionaires.	1980–1988
743 / 748	Pegaso 5064-B	Maiso	Withdrawn in the early 90s.	1985–1989
1712	Mercedes-Benz OH1625	Hispano VÖV I	One of the first Mercedes in the modern fleet.	1990
1601 / 1615	MAN 11.150 HOCL	Hispano VÖV I	Midibuses. Much of the series was sold to ALOSA.	1991
1821 / 1881	Mercedes-Benz O405	Hispano VÖV I	Legendary high-floor series with steps.	1990–1991
1882 / 1896	Mercedes-Benz O405	Hispano VÖV II	Bodywork evolution. Includes unit 1884 (Preserved).	1991–1992
501 / 505	Van Hool A508	Van Hool	Small midibuses for narrow lines.	1993
301 / 324	MAN	Van Hool A300	Massive introduction of MAN engines.	1993–1996
900 / 901	Mercedes-Benz O405N2 CNG	Hispano VÖV I	Pioneering units powered by gas (CNG).	1995
201 / 203	MAN NL202F	Hispano VÖV II	First MAN models with low-floor configuration.	1997
756 / 759	Pegaso	Van Hool	Last Pegaso units to provide service.	1997
805 / 807	Mercedes-Benz O405N2	Hispano VÖV II	Units 806 and 807 withdrawn after fire damage.	1997
836 / 850	Mercedes-Benz O405N2	Hispano VÖV II	Includes unit 836 (Mobile Classroom).	1998–1999
1100 / 1135	Volvo B7L	Hispano Habit	Large series with Volvo chassis. Several fire withdrawals.	2001–2003
1 / 7	Mercedes-Benz Sprinter W904	Unvi Cidade I	Microbuses for neighborhood services.	2002–2005
551 / 576	MAN NM223.3F	Hispano Habit	Low-floor midibuses.	2002–2005
1020 / 1033	Mercedes-Benz OC500LF	Hispano Habit	12-meter units from the 1000 series.	2004–2005
1039	Mercedes-Benz O530	Citaro	Currently preserved for Road Safety Education.	2005
1040 / 1054	Mercedes-Benz OC500LF	Hispano Habit	Continuation and end of the 1000 series.	2006
250 / 256	MAN NL273F	Hispano Habit	Last 12-meter "Habit" models.	2007
577 / 581	MAN NM243.3F	Hispano Habit	Midibuses withdrawn due to fleet renewal.	2007
257 / 262	MAN NL273	Lion´s City	Introduction of the new MAN Lion's City bodywork.	2008
8	Mercedes-Benz Sprinter W906	Sprinter City 65	Second-generation microbus.	2009
582 / 584	MAN NM243.3F / 253F	Burillo Cronos	Midibuses with Burillo bodywork.	2009–2011
101 / 102	VDL SBR4000	Ayats Bravo City	Double-decker units, withdrawn.	2011
263 / 271	MAN NL280	Lion´s City	Sold to other national fleets after withdrawal.	2011
400 / 407	Scania N270 UB	Castrosua City Versus	Units with Scania chassis and Castrosua bodywork.	2011
600 / 604	Mercedes-Benz Citaro C2	Citaro C2	Modern units sold to ALSA after withdrawal.	2014

=== Historical Heritage and Special Units ===
The preservation of these units allows for tracing the timeline of urban transport evolution in the city, from the robustness of the 90s to the total accessibility of the 21st century:

- The Era of Robustness (1991): The Mercedes-Benz O405 (1884) with Hispano VÖV I bodywork is the prime example of high-floor vehicles and high mechanical reliability. After a period of service with the Municipal Police, its entry into the Basque Railway Museum answers the need to preserve the classic square design that defined European mobility in the late 20th century.
- The Transition to Low Floors (1998): With the arrival of the Mercedes-Benz O405 N2 (836), the Hispano VÖV II bodywork was introduced, featuring more aerodynamic lines and, above all, the elimination of steps at the entrance. This open and accessible configuration facilitated its subsequent conversion into the Guztion Ikasgela project, allowing the vehicle to become a fully functional mobile classroom for schools.
- The Consolidation of the Citaro Standard (2005): The Mercedes-Benz O530 (1039) marks the modern standard of comfort and active safety. Being a unit designed entirely by Mercedes-Benz (Evobus), it incorporates advances in acoustic signaling and automatic ramps. These features make it the perfect tool for Road Safety Education, where students are taught not only traffic rules but also how to use accessibility technologies.

Preserved and Special Service Units (Chronological Order)
Series	Plate	Chassis	Bodywork	Observations	Year
1884	BI-0301-BJ	Mercedes-Benz O405	Hispano VÖV I	Historical Preservation. Custodied in the Basque Railway Museum by the AAF.	1991
836	BI-6902-CK	Mercedes-Benz O405N2	Hispano VÖV II	Mobile Classroom (Guztion Ikasgela). Transformed for pedagogical activities.	1998
1039	6689 DPY	Mercedes-Benz O530	Citaro	Road Safety Education. Unit used for citizen training and awareness.	2005

Bilbao City View

The Bilbao tourist bus runs a circular route through the city's most emblematic landmarks using a Hop-on Hop-off system, allowing passengers to board and disembark freely for 24 hours.

=== Fares and Schedules (2026) ===
Ticket Type	Fare	Summer (Jun-Sep)	Winter (Oct-May)
24h Ticket (Adult)	€15.00	10:00 AM to 8:00 PM	10:30 AM to 6:30 PM
24h Ticket (Child 6-12)	€7.00	10:00 AM to 8:00 PM	10:30 AM to 6:30 PM
Frequency	—	Every 30 min	Every 60 min

=== Specific Service Fleet ===
The units assigned to this service are double-decker buses with open-top upper decks, specifically designed for urban sightseeing. They feature an individual audio guide system available in 8 languages (Basque, Spanish, English, French, German, Italian, Portuguese, and Japanese) providing historical commentary for each stop. Additionally, they are equipped with access ramps for people with reduced mobility and USB chargers at the seats.

Manufacturer	Model	Length	Year	Series	Units	Type
Volvo	B9TL Unvi Urbis 2.5 DD	12 m	2011	105-106	2	Diesel
