= JOLED =

Japanese display manufacturer

JOLED Inc.
- Native name: 株式会社; JOLED
- Type: Private KK
- Industry: Electronics
- Founded: January 5, 2015; 11 years ago
- Defunct: March 27, 2023
- Fate: Bankrupted
- Headquarters: Chiyoda, Tokyo, Japan
- Key people: Tadashi Ishibashi (CEO and President)
- Products: OLEDs
- Number of employees: 590
- Website: j-oled.com

JOLED Inc. (Japanese: 株式会社 JOLED, Kabushiki-gaisha JOLED) was a Japanese display technology company headquartered in Tokyo, Japan, incorporated in 2015 as the result of a consolidation of the OLED business units of Panasonic and Sony. Notable for pioneering an inkjet printing process for coating emissive materials, the company is specializing in development and production of OLED displays and of cost-effective manufacturing systems for them.

== History ==
Sumitomo Chemical, a main supplier to Japanese electronics makers, acquired Cambridge Display Technology in 2007, procuring polymer organic emitter technology.

Panasonic and Sony, the producer of Sony XEL-1, had been developing OLED technology independently and, in July 2012, struck an agreement to jointly conduct the development to make OLED televisions commercially viable. At the CES 2013, the prototypes of inkjet-printed, RGB OLED television as large as 56-inch were demonstrated by Panasonic. However, aside from unveiling prototypes, the pact between the two companies failed to deliver on its mission and was brought to an end in December 2013.

On July 31, 2014, Sony, Panasonic and Japan Display, the display joint venture of Hitachi, Toshiba and Sony, announced plans to establish a company named JOLED by early 2015 that inherits the OLED operations of Panasonic and Sony, which will withhold some assets related to its professional business, to develop small-to-medium size OLED displays namely for tablet devices, not the larger ones for televisions they had been working on, and that there is a negotiation ongoing for investment with INCJ, a public-private fund in Japan. Apart from INCJ which would inject 75 percent of startup capital, Japan Display (15%), Panasonic (5%), and Sony (5%) were set to participate as initial investors as well.

In January 2015, JOLED formally came into operation, and reportedly started to make use of Sony's WRGB technology and Panasonic's inkjet printing method, targeting markets for tablets, laptops and signage.

In 2016, Japan Display made clear of its intention to increase its stake in JOLED to more than 50 percent by the end of 2017 to bolster its own OLED business but the plan did not materialize.

In March 2017, JOLED made its first exhibition of printed OLED displays ranging from 12 to 21 inches at the CeBIT 2017 held in Hanover, Germany. By May, the company started to sample 21-inch, 4K OLED display panels that were built in a top emission structure with RGB subpixels called the "pure RGB stripes", likely coming from Sony's Super Top Emission Technology as against WRGB like previous reports have suggested, and in December, it shipped Sony a first batch of the panels for high-end medical displays, becoming the world's first to sell an OLED display panel manufactured with an inkjet printing technology, which is considered to be more efficient than an existing evaporation method requiring costly vacuum chambers and metal masks, expectedly bringing down manufacturing cost by 20 to 30 percent according to the company's own account in 2017.

In January 2018, Asus announced a 21.6-inch monitor using the JOLED panel.

In March 2018, JOLED attracted fresh fundings totalling around US$400 million led by Denso. In July, JOLED started to build a mass production facility for its display panels in Nomi, Ishikawa with an aim to start operation in 2020. In November 2019, the construction of the Nomi plant has been completed.

In April 2019, JOLED started the construction of a new plant in Chiba at which display modules will be manufactured using OLED panels from the Nomi plant, stating that it would go on line sometime in 2020.

In October 2019, Eizo debuted a high-end monitor featuring the 21-inch OLED panel from JOLED kicking off the trial production at the Nomi plant. Toyota announced the incorporation of a flexible OLED display co-developed by JOLED and Denso into its concept car, the Toyota LQ, the same year.

In June 2020, CSOT, a TCL Technology company, invested US$281 million and took a 10.76 percent stake in JOLED which would in turn license its technology for TCL's development of OLED televisions, which might be incorporating quantum dots.

In late 2020, JOLED announced the respective partnerships with U.S-based Rosen Aviation and Germany-based AERQ, both aviation display suppliers.

At the CES 2021, LG Electronics unveiled its first 32-inch OLED display product, which features JOLED's panel.

On March 27, 2023, the company filed for bankruptcy with $250m in liabilities.

== Products ==
As of July 2020, 4K RGB OLED panels of three different sizes - 22-inch, 27-inch, and 32-inch - were set to be available for sale. The company has stated that it aims to produce and sell 10- to 32-inch OLEDs including transparent or flexible ones.

As of 2021, JOLED markets its OLED displays under the brand name OLEDIO.

=== List of products ===
Display products from JOLED
Display size (inches)	Resolution	Peak luminance	Contrast ratio	Panel thickness	Release date	Notes	Buyers
22	4K	350 cd/m^{2}	1,000,000:1	1.3 mm	Dec 2017	OLEDIO brand; flat panel	Sony, Asus, Eizo
28	4K	540 cd/m^{2}	1,000,000:1	1.22 mm	Jul 2020	OLEDIO; flat panel	
32	4K	540 cd/m^{2}	1,000,000:1	1.22 mm	Jul 2020	OLEDIO; flat panel	LG Electronics
