= Japan Display =

Japanese display manufacturer

Japan Display Inc. 株式会社ジャパンディスプレイ
- Type: Public KK
- Traded as: TYO: 6740
- Industry: Electronics
- Predecessor: Sony Mobile Display; Toshiba Mobile Display; Hitachi Displays
- Founded: April 1, 2012; 14 years ago
- Headquarters: Landic Shinbashi Building 2, 3-7-1, Nishi-shinbashi, Minato, Tokyo, 105-0003, Japan
- Area served: Worldwide
- Key people: Scott Callon (Chairman and CEO)
- Products: Development, production and sale of small- and medium-sized displays devices and related products
- Revenue: ▼US$6.76 billion (FY 2018) (¥ 717.52 billion)
- Net income: ▼US$2.33 billion (FY 2018) (¥ 247.24 billion)
- Owner: Ichigo Trust (44.26%)
- Number of employees: 6,660 (as of March 31, 2022)
- Website: Official website

Japan Display Inc. (株式会社ジャパンディスプレイ, Kabushiki-gaisha Japan Disupurei), commonly called by its abbreviated name, JDI, is the Japanese display technology joint venture formed by the merger of the small and medium-sized liquid crystal display businesses of Sony, Toshiba, and Hitachi.

As of March 2014, JDI was one of the major display suppliers to Apple's iPhone. Also, it was a key supplier to Nintendo Switch, along with Sharp Corporation, until 2017.

As of 2020, JDI has research and production of three types of displays ongoing under its operation: LCD, OLED, and microLED.

== History ==
On August 31, 2011, Sony, Toshiba, and Hitachi agreed to a merger of their respective small-to-medium-sized LCD businesses, supported by an investment of two hundred billion yen from INCJ. Soon after, INCJ and Panasonic also began talks on the acquisition of one of Panasonic's factories.

JDI started its operation on April 1, 2012, after it had finalized the agreement between the stakeholders on November 15, 2011.

In April 2013, Japan Display West, Japan Display Central, and Japan Display East were merged. In October, Taiwan Display Inc. was established.

On March 19, 2014, the company was listed on the first section of the Tokyo Stock Exchange.

JDI had accumulated consecutive losses since its IPO, a restructuring plan was announced in 2017, including closing down a production line in Japan and layoffs of approximately a third of its workforce.

A newly created entity INCJ, Ltd. had become the largest shareholder of JDI with 25,29 % of total shares since September 21, 2018 as a result of a corporate split of the old INCJ.

From 2019 onwards, the company began to actively seek further investments as its financial difficulties worsened. It went on to sign a memorandum of understanding to sell 49.82% of the company to Suwa Investment Holdings LLC at a sale price of US$715 million. Suwa was the name of a group of investors, which included the Chinese Silk Road Fund and Harvest Tech Investment Management, Taiwan's TPK Holdings, and Fubon Financial Holdings.

On June 12, 2019, JDI disclosed that major changes are to be implemented due to sluggish sales in the Mobile Business Division. It announced one plant would be closed and another has suspended operation. A major reduction of the workforce was also planned. On June 27, $100 million investment was announced by Apple, boosting the stock price of JDI by 32 percent at the time.

In October 2019, JDI revealed it has started producing OLED displays for Apple's smartwatch.

On December 26, it officially entered talks to sell its plant in Hakusan, Ishikawa to Sharp Corporation for 80 to 90 billion yen which is about US$800 million, with a plan to avail the profit to the repayment of the loan made by Apple whose investment partially funded the construction of the plant. The Hakusan plant was built in 2015 and began operations in 2016 at a cost of US$1.5 billion, and has been partly idle since June 2019, due to Apple's use of OLED displays.

Due to the financial trouble caused by its late decision to manufacture OLED displays and the loan from Apple, the company's OLED affiliate, JOLED, has not yet been able to compete with other manufacturers, whilst more than half of JDI's revenue still came from the shrinking IPS LCD panel sales to Apple.

In February 2020, Ichigo Asset management, a multinational private investment fund, gained control of JDI in exchange for US$715 million of investment. In turn, the memorandum signed with Suwa a year before was terminated. INCJ and other existing shareholders retained stakes in the company.

In April 2020, in accordance with the talks held in December, JDI began to sell LCD production equipment valued at US$200 million to Apple, with plans to sell the real estate of the Hakusan plant to Sharp. This will allow JDI to focus on its remaining product demand and factories. The sales have been completed by October.

In July 2020, the CEO of JDI revealed the company's plan to start mass production of OLED display panels for smartphones "as early as 2022" with a novel manufacturing technology, adding that it would require new funding.

In February 2025, Japan Display announced plans to end production at its Mobara factory and consolidate LCD production at its Ishikawa factory. Production at Mobara ended in November 2025. On 30 September 2026, the company signed an agreement to sell the factory, with handover scheduled for 31 March 2027. It forecast a consolidated gain of approximately ¥51.4 billion; the sale price was not disclosed.

== Technology ==
JDI has produced active-matrix displays driven by TFTs based on a low-temperature polycrystalline-silicon ("LTPS") process instead of amorphous silicon, allowing higher resolutions of their displays. The In-Plane-Switching technology developed by Hitachi also has been used. The company has developed an improvement for darker black pixels (true-black appearance), called "IPS-NEO", which reduces the light shining through from the backlighting.

Its "Pixel Eyes" technology incorporates the touch function into the LCD panel itself; combined with the company's transparent display technology, a transparent fingerprint reader that could be featured in smartphones was announced in 2018.

For reflective LCDs without backlighting, JDI has developed an addressing technique using a thin-film memory device SRAM in addition to the conventional TFT for each pixel, so that a still image can be stored consuming a low amount of energy.

In November 2019, JDI unveiled a prototype of a 12.3-inch transparent LCD that has a transmittance rate of as high as 87 percent.

In December 2019, it announced that it has developed a 1.6-inch microLED display module with a pixel density of 265 ppi and a peak brightness of 3,000 nits, which can be assembled to form a large screen.

== See also ==
- Sony Mobile Display
