= Digital Fine Contrast =

Contrast-enhancing display technology

Digital Fine Contrast is a contrast-enhancing display technology introduced in 2006 by LG Display. It is used in the company's "Flatron" line of TFT monitors and implements a 'smart function' whereby it dynamically detects the characteristics of each frame to be displayed and automatically adjusts its contrast to obtain a sharper and more vivid image. The system comprises three units: ACR (Auto Contents Recognition), DCE (Digital Contrast Enhancer) and DCM (Digital Contrast Mapper).

The initial announcement claimed monitors with DFC could achieve a contrast ratio of 1600:1, while later products have been presented as capable of ratios even as high as 2,000,000:1, and there are SAMSUNG LCD TV sets that claim 500,000:1 with LCD monitors claiming 5,000,000:1.
