= Burst dimming =

Dimming control method

Burst dimming is a method to control dimming of cold cathode fluorescent lamps (CCFLs) and LEDs by using pulse width modulation (PWM) at approximately 100-300 Hz which is supposed to be above the noticeable flicker limit for the human eye. This technique is sometimes used with TFT displays to control backlighting. An alternative dimming method is to control lamp current.
