= LG Display =

South Korean display manufacturer

LG Display Co., Ltd. LG디스플레이
- Type: Public
- Traded as: KRX: 034220; NYSE: LPL
- Industry: Electronics
- Founded: 1999; 27 years ago
- Headquarters: Seoul, South Korea
- Key people: Chung Chul-dong (CEO)
- Products: TFT-LCD panels; OLEDs; Flexible displays
- Revenue: ▼ ₩26.152 trillion (approx. 20 billion USD) (2022)
- Operating income: ▼US$76.45 million (2018)
- Net income: ▼ -US$147.138 million (2018)
- Owner: LG Electronics (37%)
- Number of employees: 70,707 (2023)
- Website: lgdisplay.com

Former logo of LG.Phillips LCD

LG Display Co., Ltd. (Korean: LG 디스플레이) is one of the world's largest manufacturers and supplier of thin-film transistor liquid crystal display (TFT-LCD) panels, OLEDs and flexible displays. LG Display is headquartered in Seoul, South Korea, and currently operates nine fabrication facilities and seven back-end assembly facilities in South Korea, China, Poland and Mexico.

LG Display has manufactured displays used in products such as the iPhone 14 Pro and Sony's OLED TVs.

== History ==
LG Display was originally formed as a joint venture by the Korean electronics company LG Electronics and the Dutch company Philips in 1999 to manufacture active matrix liquid crystal displays (LCDs) and was formerly known as LG.Philips LCD, but Philips sold off all its shares in late 2008. Both companies also had another joint venture, called LG.Philips Displays, dedicated to manufacturing cathode ray tubes, deflection yokes, and related materials such as glass and phosphors.

On 12 December 2008, LG.Philips LCD announced its plan to change its corporate name to LG Display upon receiving approval at the company's annual general meeting of shareholders on 29 February. The company claimed the name change reflected changes following the reduction of Philips' equity stake.

The company has eight manufacturing plants in Gumi and Paju, South Korea. It also has a module assembly plant in Nanjing and Guangzhou in China and Wroclaw in Poland.

LG Display became an independent company in July 2004 when it was concurrently listed on the New York Stock Exchange (NYSE: LPL) and the South Korean Stock Exchange (KRX: 034220).

They are one of the main licensed manufacturers of the more color-accurate IPS panels used by Dell, NEC, ASUS, Apple (including iMacs, iPads, iPhones, iPod Touches) and others, which were developed by Hitachi.

LG Display discontinued its LCD production lines in South Korea in late 2022, and will completely exit the LCD manufacturing business with the sale of its last remaining plant in Guangzhou, China to be completed in June 2024, focusing more of its budget and production on OLED panels. LG Display said September 26, 2024. it has sold its facilities in China to a subsidiary of Chinese tech giant TCL Group for 2 trillion won (US$1.5 billion) as part of its business reorganizing effort.

=== LCD price fixing ===
In December 2010, the EU fined LG Display €215 million for its part in an LCD price fixing scheme. Other companies were also fined for a combined total of €648.9 million, including Chimei Innolux, AU Optronics, Chunghwa Picture Tubes Ltd., and HannStar Display Corp. LG Display has said it is considering appealing the fine.

This followed the 2008 case in the US, when LG Display, Chunghwa Picture Tubes and Sharp Corp., agreed to plead guilty and pay $585 million in criminal fines for conspiring to fix prices of liquid crystal display panels. LG Display would pay $400 million, the second-highest criminal fine that the US Justice Department antitrust division had ever imposed.

== Corporate Governance ==
As of 2023

Shareholder	Stake (%)	Flag
LG Electronics	37.90%	South Korea
National Pension Service	4.70%	South Korea

== Products ==
Some examples of products that use LCD panels from LG display are Apple's 2009 27-inch iMac, Apple's Thunderbolt Display, and Dell's U2711 LCD Monitor.

Additional products include Apple's 20-inch Cinema Display and Dell's UltraSharp 2005FPW LCD Monitor. These use the "LG.Philips" branding.

As of 2022, LG Display is the manufacturer of the OLED panels used in Sony's OLED TVs.

As of late 2022, LG Display was one of the two suppliers for displays for the iPhone 14 Pro, along with Samsung Display.

LG was one of the two suppliers of LCD Displays for the first "Retina" model of the MacBook Pro in 2012, along with Samsung.

LG Display showcased stretchable displays at Seoul Fashion Week 2025, integrated into clothing and bags, offering dynamic design flexibility.

== Controversies ==
In November 2008, LG ("LG Philips" at that time) plead guilty and was sentenced to pay criminal fines by the U.S. Department of Justice (DOJ), European Commission and South Korea Fair Trade Commission, for its participation in a five-year conspiracy to fix the prices of thin-film transistor LCD panels sold worldwide.

== See also ==
- LG Group
- Digital Fine Contrast
- Economy of South Korea
- IPS Panel
- Film-type Patterned Retarder
