= Japan Investment Corporation =

Japanese sovereign wealth fund

- Native name: 株式会社産業革新投資機構
- Company type: Sovereign wealth fund
- Industry: Investment management
- Founded: September 25, 2018; 7 years ago
- Headquarters: Toranomon, Minato-ku, Tokyo, Japan
- Key people: Keisuke Yokoo (Chairman & CEO)
- Revenue: ¥25.34 billion (March 2024)
- Net income: ¥2.46 billion (March 2024)
- Total assets: ¥1.85 trillion (March 2024)
- Total equity: ¥5.14 billion (March 2024)
- Owner: Government of Japan
- Subsidiaries: Innovation Network Corporation of Japan; JIC Capital; JIC Venture Growth Investments
- Website: www.j-ic.co.jp

Japan Investment Corporation (株式会社産業革新投資機構, Kabushikigaisha sangyō kakushin tōshi kikō), abbreviated as JIC, is a Japanese sovereign wealth fund. It is an Authorized Corporation under the Ministry of Economy, Trade and Industry (METI).

In 2021, according to S&P Global Market Intelligence and Preqin, its private equity arm, JIC Capital, was ranked as the fifth largest private equity firm in the world based on total fundraising over the most recent five-year period.

== Background ==
In September 2018, the Innovation Network Corporation of Japan (INCJ) was reorganized with JIC being spun-off as a new separate entity following the enforcement of the amendment to the Act on Strengthening Industrial Competitiveness. INCJ then became a subsidiary of JIC.

JIC initially planned to invest $18 billion in four funds that made domestic and overseas investments. In October 2018, JIC launched its first fund, a $2 billion JIC-US Fund that targeted US biotech and drug discovery firms. The other three funds that were to be launched later would invest in private equity, venture capital and Japanese corporations with the aim of revitalizing them.

In December 2018, most of JIC's senior management team resigned. This followed a dispute regarding remuneration as METI thought it was too high. According to The Japan Times, METI also demanded that the funds obtain approval for each investment. As a result, JIC operations were temporarily suspended.

In July 2020, JIC established its venture capital arm, JIC Venture Growth Investments and in September 2020, established its private equity arm, JIC Capital.

== Notable deals ==
In May 2022, it was reported that JIC was considering a bid to acquire Toshiba in what would be the largest private equity deal in Japan. JIC had initially teamed up with Japan Industrial Partners (JIP) but parted way over disagreeing over JIP's intention to keep CEO Shimada and his team. JIC later discussed joining up with Bain Capital but opted to sit out, believing its plan for deep restructuring would not appeal to management.

In December 2023, JIC and a consortium acquired Shinko Electric Industries, the chip-packaging unit of Fujitsu for $4.7 billion.

In April 2024, JIC acquired semiconductor company JSR Corporation taking it private in a $6 billion deal.

== Senior leadership ==
=== List of presidents and CEOs ===
1. Masaaki Tanaka (2018)
2. Keisuke Yokoo (2019–present)
