= Planar Systems =

American digital display manufacturer

Planar Systems, Inc.
- Logo used since January 15, 2008
- Company type: Subsidiary
- Industry: Technology
- Founded: May 23, 1983; 43 years ago
- Headquarters: Hillsboro, Oregon, U.S. 45.555336°N 122.911383°W
- Key people: Sidney Rittenberg, President and CEO; Stephanie Hines, VP
- Products: Monitors, Display Screen & Projectors
- Revenue: $1.8 billion USD(2018)
- Operating income: ▼$1.6 million USD(2018)
- Net income: ▲$3.8 Million USD(2018)
- Number of employees: 456 (2018)
- Parent: Leyard Optoelectronic Co.
- Website: www.planar.com

Planar Systems, Inc. is an American digital display manufacturing corporation with a facility in Hillsboro, Oregon. Founded in 1983 as a spin-off from Tektronix, it was the first U.S. manufacturer of electroluminescent (EL) digital displays. Planar currently makes a variety of other specialty displays, and has been an independent subsidiary of Leyard Optoelectronic Co. since 2015. The headquarters, leadership team and employees still remain in Hillsboro, Oregon.

== History ==
=== 1980s ===
Planar was founded on May 23, 1983 by Jim Hurd, Chris King, John Laney and others as a spin-off from the Solid State Research and Development Group of the Beaverton, Oregon, based Tektronix. In 1986, a division spun off from Planar to work on projection technology and formed InFocus.

=== 1990s ===
In 1991, Planar purchased FinLux, a competitor in Espoo, Finland. This location now serves as the company's European headquarters. Planar's executives took the company public in 1993, listing the stock on the NASDAQ boards Planar acquired Tektronix's avionics display business, creating the short-lived Planar Advance in 1994. Standish Industries, a manufacturer of flat panel LCDs in Lake Mills, Wisconsin, was sold to Planar in 1997. This plant was closed in 2002 as worldwide LCD manufacturing shifted to East Asian countries.

=== 2000s ===
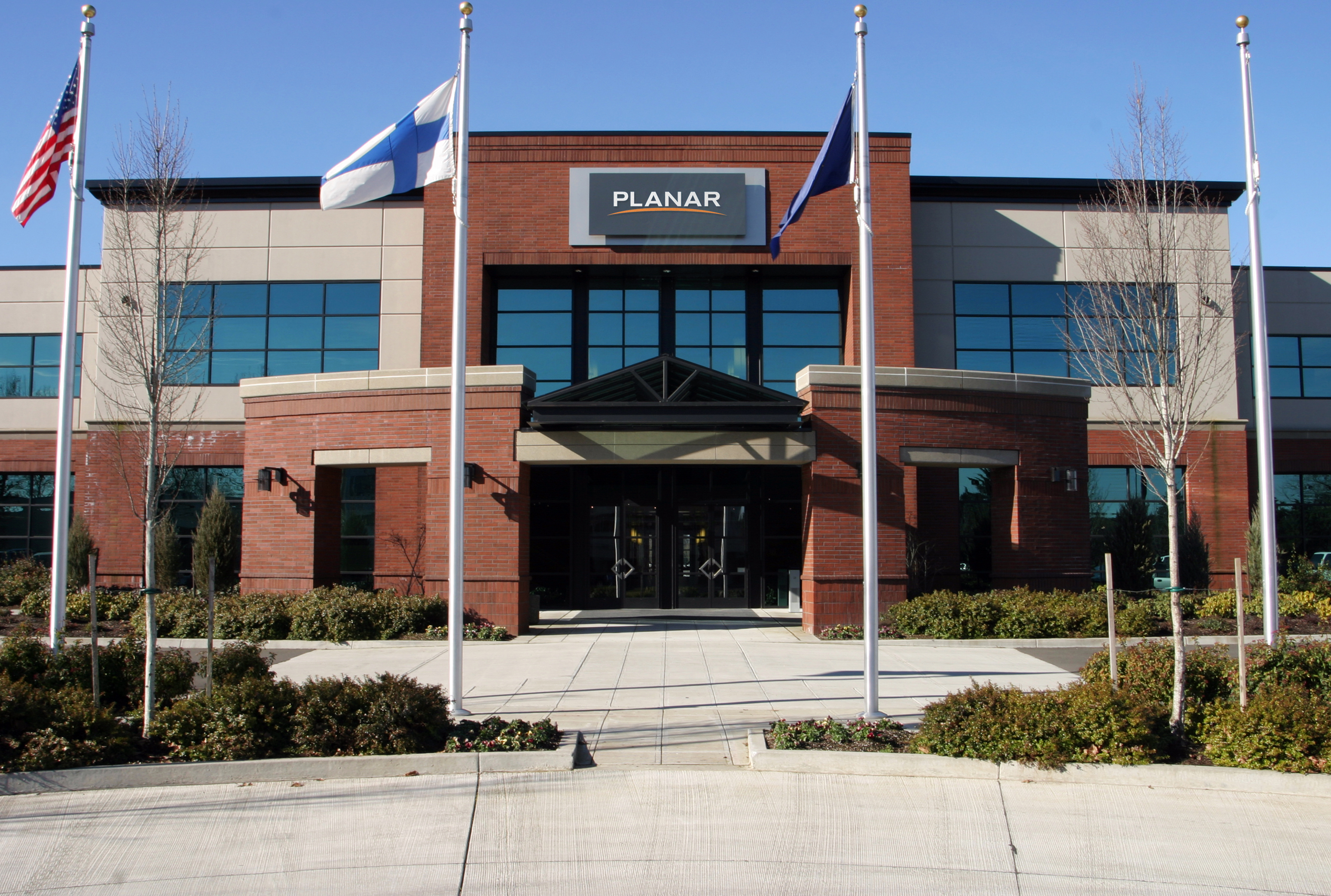
Former company headquarters

On April 23, 2002, DOME Imaging Systems was purchased by Planar and became the company's medical business unit. Planar acquired Clarity Visual Systems (founded by former InFocus employees) on September 12, 2006, now referred to as the Control Room and Signage business unit. On June 19, 2006, Planar acquired Runco International, a leading brand in the high-end, custom home theater market. On August 6, 2008, Planar sold its medical business unit to NDS Surgical Imaging.

=== 2010s ===
In November 2012, Planar announced the sale of its electroluminescent business to Beneq Oy, a supplier of production and research equipment for thin film coatings. Under the terms of the transaction, consideration consists of a $6.5 million base purchase price, of which $3.9 million was paid in cash at closing and $2.6 million was paid in the form of a promissory note. Planar was purchased by Leyard Optoelectronic Co. of China in 2015 for $157 million. It became a subsidiary after formerly trading on the NASDAQ under the symbol PLNR.

In November 2016, Planar announced that it was to enter a merger agreement with NaturalPoint Inc., which sells infrared point tracking systems for use on CGI movie sets (Optitrack), and home use both for assisted computing (Smartnav) and computer gaming (TrackIR). The merger was finalized in January 2017. NaturalPoint will remain a separate business with its own executive team, customers, and market initiatives.

=== 2020s ===
In 2020, a nearly 32-foot-long, 5-foot-high Planar TVF Series LED video wall was added to Lea County Communication Authority (LCCA)’s Lea County 911 Call Center.

Planar completed the latest of three installations at the University of Oregon. The addition of Planar® CarbonLight™ CLI Flex™ pliable LED video wall displays, custom designed into two curved LED installations, at Matthew Knight Arena follows the companies deployments at the university’s Hatfield-Dowlin Complex in 2013 and Student Recreation Center in 2015.

The company also expanded its presence at Clemson University in Clemson, South Carolina by adding an impressive collection of 126 Planar LCD displays and two Planar LED video walls in the Wilbur O. and Ann Powers College of Business. 200 Planar displays also appear in the university’s four-story Watt Family Innovation Center following an installation in 2016.

On November 10, 2020, Planar expanded their US government division to enhance the company’s product security program to further adapt products and processes to best meet the product security needs of customers.

== Operations ==
Planar currently assembles and services videowalls, projectors, and other displays in Hillsboro. Planar's EL manufacturing operations were consolidated into Planar's Espoo, Finland facility in 2002. Additional large-format displays are assembled and integrated in Albi, France.

== Leyard Merger ==
On November 27, 2015, Planar closed its sale to become a subsidiary of Leyard Optoelectronic Co., a Chinese LED display product corporation. Headquarters operations for Planar remain in Beaverton, OR following the sale.

== Locations ==
In addition to its Oregon, U.S. headquarters, Planar has worldwide reach. Its sales offices are located in Europe, North America, and Asia. It has manufacturing facilities in France, North America, and Finland.

== See also ==
- Silicon Forest
- List of companies based in Oregon
