= Response time compensation =

Response time compensation for liquid-crystal displays is also known as "Overdrive". LCDs moderate light flow by rotating liquid crystal molecules to various alignments where they transmit more or less light depending on the electrical setting at each individual pixel.

The speed at which these liquid crystal molecules rotate is relatively slow, below the image refresh rate. As a result, when a scene is changing fast or there is a fast moving image being displayed (such as a golf ball flying off the head of a club), the object is at best blurry and can disappear from the image entirely. Overdrive attempts to compensate for this by, instead of sending the desired voltage to each pixel, it sends a higher initial voltage and then moderates that voltage in order to drive the rotation of the liquid crystal faster. Electrically, it "steps on the gas" in order to get to the right speed quickly, then eases off as it approaches the desired performance level.

An individual inventor (Robert Hotto) patented Overdrive whose company "Positive Technologies" owned the rights to it. The technology was copied by many of the large LCD companies and renamed to avoid paying royalties. The ownership issues were eventually settled in a lawsuit with the defendants agreeing to pay royalties to Positive Technologies. The patent is now expired, and the technology is royalty-free.

== See also ==
- Lead–lag compensator
