= Runco International =

American display device manufacturer

Runco International is a subsidiary of Planar Systems, Inc., an American multinational corporation headquartered in Beaverton, Oregon, that manufactures a wide range of display devices.

== History ==
Runco International was founded by Sam Runco with wife, Lori, in Northern California in 1987. He is a founding member of the Custom Electronic Design and Installation Association (CEDIA) and has also received the Lifetime Achievement Award] from CEDIA. Sam Runco has also been inducted into Dealerscope magazine's Hall Of Fame and for his contributions to the home theater industry.

The first Runco large screen projection system was introduced in 1970. Prior to the incorporation of Runco International, the company functioned as Runco Video. Cinemabeam was Runco Video's first projector to feature external convergence controls that allowed the video image to be projected onto large screens. Two years later, Runco magnified the image of a 15" television using a Fresnel lens to project it onto a wall, a turning point for large screen entertainment.

Runco International was incorporated in 1987 and launched the Runco International HT (Home Theater) video projector. As the home theater market expanded, the company acquired additional consumer electronics brands, including the Vidikron video display brand. By the early 1990s, Runco International had expanded its corporate offices in California, and developed worldwide distribution. It had become a popular brand of CRT projectors, selling models produced by other manufacturers such as Zenith Electronics, NEC, and Barco.

Runco last recorded net sales as a private company of $54.6 million in the 12 months ending March 31, 2007. In May 2007, Runco was acquired by Planar Systems, Inc. Runco operations including product design, manufacturing, customer service, marketing and training teams were transitioned to Planar's headquarters located in Beaverton.

== Product lines ==
- Front projectors: Signature Series, VideoXtreme Series, Reflection Series
- Plasma display monitors: PlasmaWall Portfolio, CinemaWall Portfolio
- Liquid-crystal display monitors: Crystal Portfolio, Climate Portfolio
- In-wall projection systems: VideoWall, CineWall
- Video processors: DHD Digital Controller, SDC Digital Controller
- Signal enhancers: LiveLink DVI Cabling System

== Registered products and technologies ==
- CinemaPro
- CinemaWall
- CineWide
- Crystal Series
- Dynamic Pixel Protection
- Imagix
- IntelliWide
- LiveLink
- PlasmaView
- ProjectAVision
- Radiant
- Reflection
- Runco
- Theater Manager
- VHD
- Vidikron
- Virtual High Definition
- VirtualWide
- Vivix
- Vivx
- WideVision
- Video Xtreme
- Pixel for Pixe
