= Innovation Network Corporation of Japan =

Public–private partnership project

Coordinates: 35.684002°N 139.766908°E

Innovation Network Corporation of Japan (INCJ) 株式会社産業革新機構
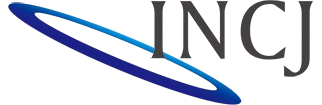
- Type: Subsidiary
- Industry: Diversified industries, mainly Environment and energy Life sciences Electronics; Machinery and components Advanced material
- Founded: July 27, 2009; 17 years ago
- Headquarters: Marunouchi Kitaguchi Bldg., 1-6-5, Marunouchi, Chiyoda-ku, Tokyo, Japan
- Key people: Kimikazu Noumi (CEO); Haruyasu Asakura (COO)
- Parent: Japan Investment Corporation
- Website: www.incj.co.jp

The Innovation Network Corporation of Japan (INCJ) (株式会社産業革新機構, Kabushiki-gaisha Sangyō Kakushin Kikō), headquartered in Tokyo, is a public-private partnership between the Japanese government and 19 major corporations.

Established as a temporary (15 years) corporate entity on July 27, 2009, the organization's prime objective is "boosting the competitiveness of Japanese firms by promoting a philosophy of 'open innovation' and creating next-generation businesses in promising new technologies by providing capital and managerial support, through private-public partnership."

The business and investments of INCJ are supervised by the Ministry of Economy, Trade and Industry of Japan (METI).

== History ==
In early 2009, the Japanese government along with major Japanese corporations conceptualized the legal framework of a corporate entity - whose aim is to leverage Japanese technological and industrial prowess to create sustainable next-generation businesses using a philosophy of "Open Innovation" and enhance the value of Japanese businesses.

On July 27, 2009, the Japanese government under the Act on Special Measures for Industrial Revitalization and Other Laws to Foster Innovation in Industrial Activities in Japan, established the Innovation Network Corporation of Japan (INCJ). The INCJ was created to make investments aimed at creating an ecosystem of innovation and fostering an “open innovation” model, i.e. “flow of technology and expertise beyond the boundaries of existing organisational structures" — be it start-up companies, medium-sized enterprises or large, established firms.

In September 2018, the INCJ was reorganized with Japan Investment Corporation (JIC) being spun-off as a new separate entity following the enforcement of the amendment to the Act on Strengthening Industrial Competitiveness. INCJ then became a subsidiary of JIC.

The primary objective is to provide capital and managerial support to boost the competitiveness of Japanese firms and create next-generation businesses in promising new technologies, which contribute to innovative transformation of Japan's industrial structure.

== Organisation and leadership ==
The INCJ is headquartered at Tokyo and has a flat management structure centered around CEO and COO

Its current CEO is Kimikazu Noumi and COO, Haruyasu Asakura.

== Investments ==
Company	Country	Sector	Investment	Description	Ref.
ALPS Green Devices	Japan	Electronics	JPY 10 billion	A subsidiary of Alps Electric Corporation manufacturing energy-saving electronic devices used in smart grid devices, electric vehicles, home appliances, and information appliances.	
GENUSION	Japan	Semiconductor	JPY 2.6 billion	A developer of semiconductor memory devices	
TRILITY	Australia	Water	AUD 225 million	Formerly United Utilities Australia (UUA), an Australian water utility, acquired by ICNJ, Mitsubishi Corporation, JGC Corporation, and Manila Water from United Utilities.	
Zephyr Corporation	Japan	Wind power	JPY 1 billion	A manufacturer of small wind turbines and other energy systems	
LSIP	Japan	Life science	JPY 1 billion	Life Science Intellectual Property, Japan's first intellectual property investment fund	
ENAX	Japan	Battery	JPY 3.5 billion	A manufacturer of laminated sheet lithium-ion batteries	
JINED	Japan	Nuclear power	JPY 20 million	An industry consortium for proposal and research activities for nuclear power plant project orders in emerging countries	
Aguas Nuevas	Chile	Water	JPY 20 billion	A Chilean water utility acquired by Marubeni from the Santander Group	
Anaeropharma Science	Japan	Pharmaceutical	JPY 2.9 billion	A university venture developing anticancer agents	
Nihon Inter Electronics Corporation	Japan	Semiconductor	JPY 3.5 billion	A manufacturer of power semiconductor devices	
Nakamura Choukou	Japan	Machining	JPY 1.2 billion	A manufacturer of special ultra-precision equipment	
JEOL RESONANCE	Japan	Instruments	JPY 1.5 billion	A spin-off of JEOL manufacturing nuclear magnetic resonance instruments	
Peach Aviation	Japan	Airline	JPY 10 million	Japan's first low-cost carrier established by All Nippon Airways and First Eastern Investment Group, a Hong Kong investment firm	
衆智達汽車部件(常州)有限公司	China	Automotive	JPY 1.5 billion	An automotive parts maker founded in Changzhou, China, by small Japanese automotive parts makers	
Miselu	United States	Music	USD 6 million	The San Francisco-based company develops music interfaces (hardware and software) for the Apple iPad. It is run by Yoshinari Yoshikawa (CEO) and Jory Bell (CTO).	
Landis+Gyr	Switzerland	Metering	USD 680 million	A Swiss smart meter technology company acquired by Toshiba	
Japan Display	Japan	Display	JPY 200 billion	A manufacturer of liquid crystal display panels established by the integration of the small and medium size LCD businesses of Sony Mobile Display, Toshiba Mobile Display, and Hitachi Displays	
UniCarriers Corporation	Japan	Machinery	JPY 30 billion	A holding company of TCM Corporation and Nissan Forklift, which are the forklift businesses of Hitachi Construction Machinery and Nissan, respectively	
Pharma8	Japan	Pharmaceutical	JPY 550 million	A start-up developing drugs to cure Alzheimer's disease	
All Nippon Entertainment Works	United States	Entertainment	JPY 6 billion	A Hollywood industry consortium to remake the copyrighted works of Japanese entertainment, such as movies, television shows, games, books, toys, and character-licensed merchandise	
Seajacks International	United Kingdom	Wind power	JPY 35 billion	A British offshore wind farm constructor acquired by Marubeni from Riverstone Holdings	
(unnamed)	Japan	Video	JPY 60 million	A special purpose company for the incubation of voice search technology for video streaming websites, developed by the National Institute of Advanced Industrial Science and Technology (AIST)	
Digital Publishing Initiatives Japan	Japan	Publishing	JPY 15 billion	A company assisting publishers to publish and distribute e-books	
Sphelar Power	Japan	Solar power	JPY 500 million	A manufacturer of transparent, spherical solar cells founded by Hitachi High-Technologies and Kyosemi, a manufacturer of semiconductor devices	
Renesas Electronics	Japan	Semiconductors	JPY 138 billion	Research, development, design, manufacturing, sales and service related to various semiconductor products	

== Investors ==
The INCJ is capitalized at 112 billion yen. The Japanese government also provides guarantees up to a total of 1,800 billion yen for INCJ investments. This funding is used partly as a combination of venture capital and “buyout fund” to provide risk arbitrage to support a growth strategy of small and mid-size companies and to facilitate consolidation among established companies for the purpose of helping them become global leaders, as well as directly invest in new ventures.

The breakup of investors and their investments made are the following,

=== Japanese Government ===
The Japanese government provides 102 billion yen out of the total capital of 112 billion yen. The government also provides guarantees up to a total of 1,800 billion yen for INCJ investments, giving it an investment capability of approximately 1,900 billion yen (US$24 billion).

=== Corporate investors ===
The following 19 major Japanese companies have made a total investment of 10 billion JPY. Each investor has contributed 500 million yen, with the exception of DBJ, which has contributed 1 billion yen.

- Asahi Kasei Corporation
- Osaka Gas Co., Ltd.
- Sharp Corporation
- The Shoko Chukin Bank, Ltd.
- Sumitomo Chemical Co., Ltd.
- Sumitomo Corporation
- Sumitomo Electric Industries, Ltd.
- Takeda Pharmaceutical Company Limited
- Tokyo Electric Power Company, Inc.
- Toshiba Corporation
- JGC Corporation
- Development Bank of Japan Inc.
- Panasonic Corporation
- East Japan Railway Company
- Hitachi, Ltd.
- Mizuho Corporate Bank, Ltd.
- MUFG Bank, Ltd.
- General Electric Company, Japan
- JX Nippon Oil & Energy Corporation

== See also ==
- Enterprise Turnaround Initiative Corporation of Japan
