= Leyard =

Electronics manufacturer based in Beijing

Leyard Optoelectronic Co., Ltd.
- Native name: 利亚德光电集团股份有限公司
- Romanized name: Lìyǎdé guāngdiàn jítuán gǔfèn yǒuxiàn gōngsī
- Type: Public
- Traded as: SZSE: 300296
- Industry: Electronics
- Headquarters: Beijing, China
- Products: LED screen displays, LED lighting
- Number of employees: 4,783
- Website: leyard.com

Leyard Optoelectronic (Chinese: 利亚德光电集团) is a publicly traded Beijing based electronics manufacturer, producing LED products including displays and lighting. Its main business segment is in screen displays of very large dimensions.

== History ==
The company was founded in 1995. The private company went public when it was listed on the Shenzhen Stock Exchange, premiering on the ChiNext board in March 2012.

A key moment for the company was the 2008 Olympic Games when its display products were used for the opening ceremony. It manufactured displays that illuminated the Olympic Rings and also supplied a display scroll that was 1300 sq. m of its "Ground Bar" LED product, a LED display that could sustain physical activity over it including the moving wheels of a car.

By 2014 the company had become focused on international expansion. At the time it injected HK $50 million (US $6.45 million) into its Hong Kong subsidiary, Leyard (Hong Kong), and invested RMB 50 million into another subsidiary, Beijing Leyard Electronics, with the stated objective of financing international expansion. Greater interest in international expansion went hand in hand with increasing overseas sales. In financial results disclosed in 2014, Leyard reported overseas orders had soared 85 percent year on year.

Earlier in 2013 it had laid the groundwork for substantial international expansion when it entered into a joint venture agreement with MIC Electronics. Under the agreement, MIC Electronics would become the distributor of Leyard's products in India and once a certain amount of sales in India was reached, the companies would develop a factory in India.

In November 2015, Leyard acquired Planar Systems, Inc. in Oregon, via its Leyard American Corporation subsidiary. In May 2018, Leyard and Planar Systems acquired eyevis, a German manufacturer of large scale LED screen systems.

== Products ==
In 2013, Leyard released a 228-inch TV set, which was the largest TV set in the world.
