= TFT LCD =

Variant of a liquid-crystal display

A thin-film-transistor liquid-crystal display (TFT LCD) is a type of liquid-crystal display that uses thin-film transistor technology to improve image qualities such as addressability and contrast. A TFT LCD is an active matrix LCD, in contrast to passive matrix LCDs or simple, direct-driven (i.e. with segments directly connected to electronics outside the LCD) LCDs with a few segments.

TFT LCDs are used in television sets, computer monitors, mobile phones, video game systems, personal digital assistants, navigation systems, projectors, and dashboards in some automobiles and in medium to high end motorcycles.

== History ==
In February 1957, John Wallmark of RCA filed a patent application for a thin film MOSFET. Paul K. Weimer, also of RCA, implemented Wallmark's ideas and developed the thin-film transistor (TFT) in 1962, a type of MOSFET distinct from the standard bulk MOSFET. It was made with thin films of cadmium selenide and cadmium sulfide.

The idea of a TFT-based liquid-crystal display (LCD) was conceived by Bernard Lechner of RCA Laboratories in 1968. In 1971, Lechner, F. J. Marlowe, E. O. Nester and J. Tults demonstrated a 2-by-18 matrix display driven by a hybrid circuit using the dynamic scattering mode of LCDs. In 1973, T. Peter Brody, J. A. Asars and G. D. Dixon at Westinghouse Research Laboratories developed a CdSe (cadmium selenide) TFT, which they used to demonstrate the first CdSe thin-film-transistor liquid-crystal display (TFT LCD). Brody and Fang-Chen Luo demonstrated the first flat active-matrix liquid-crystal display (AM LCD) using CdSe TFTs in 1974, and then Brody coined the term "active matrix" in 1975.

By 2013, most modern high-resolution and high-quality electronic visual display devices used TFT-based active matrix displays.

As of 2024, TFT LCDs are still dominant, but compete with OLED for high brightness and high resolution displays, and compete with electronic paper for low power displays.

== Construction ==
A diagram of the pixel layout

The liquid crystal displays used in calculators and other devices with similarly simple displays have direct-driven image elements, and therefore a voltage can be easily applied across just one segment of these types of displays without interfering with the other segments. This would be impractical for a large display, because it would have a large number of (color) picture elements (pixels), and thus it would require millions of connections, both top and bottom for each one of the three colors (red, green and blue) of every pixel. To avoid this issue, the pixels are addressed in rows and columns, reducing the connection count from millions down to thousands. The column and row wires attach to transistor switches, one for each pixel. The one-way current passing characteristic of the transistor prevents the charge that is being applied to each pixel from being drained between refreshes to a display's image. Each pixel is a small capacitor with a layer of insulating liquid crystal sandwiched between transparent conductive layers of indium tin oxide (ITO).

The circuit layout process of a TFT-LCD is very similar to that of semiconductor products. However, rather than fabricating the transistors from silicon, that is formed into a crystalline silicon wafer, they are made from a thin film of amorphous silicon that is deposited on a glass panel. The silicon layer for TFT-LCDs is typically deposited using the PECVD process. Transistors take up only a small fraction of the area of each pixel and the rest of the silicon film is etched away to allow light to easily pass through it.

Polycrystalline silicon is sometimes used in displays that require higher TFT performance. Examples include small high-resolution displays such as those found in projectors or viewfinders. Amorphous silicon-based TFTs are by far the most common, due to their lower production cost, whereas polycrystalline silicon TFTs are more costly and much more difficult to produce.

== Types ==
=== Twisted nematic (TN) ===
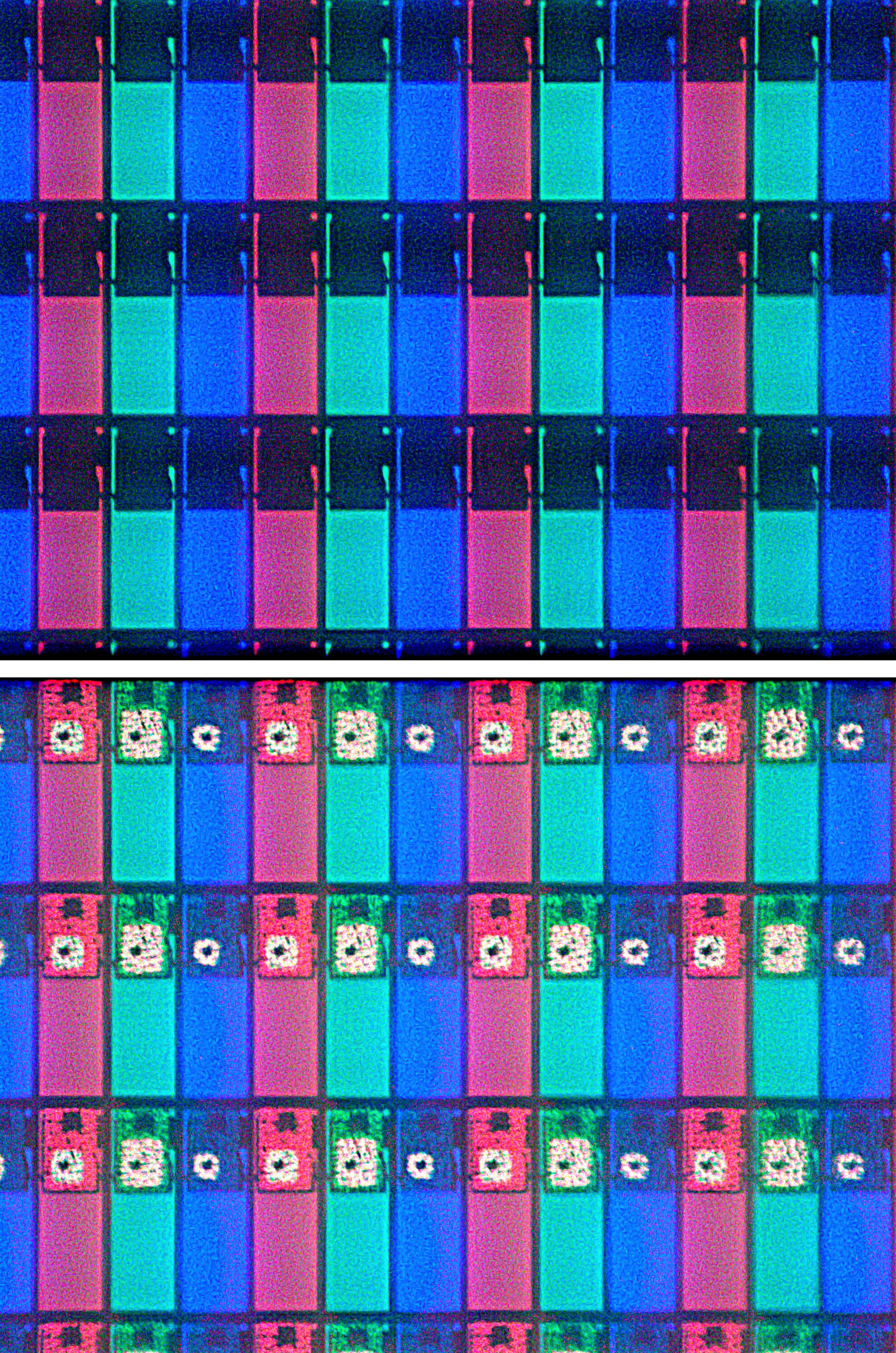
TN display under a microscope, with the transistors visible at the bottom

The twisted nematic (TN) display is one of the oldest and cheapest kind of liquid crystal display technologies. TN displays have fast pixel response times and less smearing than other types of LCDs like IPS displays, but suffer from poor color reproduction and limited viewing angles, especially in the vertical direction. When viewed at an angle that is not perpendicular to the display, colors will shift, sometimes to the point of completely inverting. Modern, high end consumer products have developed methods to overcome the technology's shortcomings, such as RTC (response time compensation / Overdrive) technologies. Modern TN displays can look significantly better than older TN displays from decades earlier, but overall TN has inferior viewing angles and poor color in comparison to other technology like IPS.

Most TN panels can represent colors using only six bits per RGB channel, or 18 bit in total, and are unable to display the 16.7 million color shades (24-bit true color) that are available using 24-bit color. Instead, these panels display interpolated 24-bit color using a dithering method that combines adjacent pixels to simulate the desired shade. They can also use a form of temporal dithering called frame rate control (FRC), which cycles between different shades with each new frame to simulate an intermediate shade. Such 18 bit panels with dithering are sometimes advertised as having "16.2 million colors". These color simulation methods are noticeable to many people and highly bothersome to some. FRC tends to be most noticeable in darker tones, while dithering appears to make the individual pixels of the LCD visible. Overall, color reproduction and linearity on TN panels is poor. Shortcomings in display color gamut (often referred to as a percentage of the NTSC 1953 color gamut) are also due to backlighting technology. It is common for older displays to range from 10% to 26% of the NTSC color gamut, whereas other kind of displays, utilizing more complicated CCFL or LED phosphor formulations or RGB LED backlights, may extend past 100% of the NTSC color gamut, a difference that is easily seen by the human eye.

The transmittance of a pixel of an LCD panel typically does not change linearly with the applied voltage, and the sRGB standard for computer monitors requires a specific nonlinear dependence of the amount of emitted light as a function of the RGB value.

=== In-plane switching (IPS) ===
In-plane switching (IPS) was developed by Hitachi in 1996 to improve on the poor viewing angle and the poor color reproduction of TN panels at that time. Its name comes from the main difference from TN panels, that the crystal molecules move parallel to the panel plane instead of perpendicular to it. This change reduces the amount of light scattering in the matrix, which gives IPS its characteristic wide viewing angles and good color reproduction.

Initial iterations of IPS technology were characterised by slow response time and a low contrast ratio but later revisions have made marked improvements to these shortcomings. Because of its wide viewing angle and accurate color reproduction (with almost no off-angle color shift), IPS is widely employed in high-end monitors aimed at professional graphic artists, although with the recent fall in price it has been seen in the mainstream market as well. IPS technology was sold to Panasonic by Hitachi.

Hitachi IPS technology development
Name	Nickname	Year	Advantage	Transmittance/ contrast ratio	Remarks
Super TFT	IPS	1996	Wide viewing angle	100/100; Base level	Most panels also support true 8-bit per channel color. These improvements came at the cost of a higher response time, initially about 50 ms. IPS panels were also extremely expensive.
Super-IPS	S-IPS	1998	Color shift free	100/137	IPS has since been superseded by S-IPS (Super-IPS, Hitachi in 1998), which has all the benefits of IPS technology with the addition of improved pixel refresh timing.
Advanced Super-IPS	AS-IPS	2002	High transmittance	130/250	AS-IPS, also developed by Hitachi in 2002, improves substantially on the contrast ratio of traditional S-IPS panels to the point where they are second only to some S-PVAs.
IPS-Provectus	IPS-Pro	2004	High contrast ratio	137/313	The latest panel from IPS Alpha Technology with a wider color gamut and contrast ratio matching PVA and ASV displays without off-angle glowing.
IPS alpha	IPS-Pro	2008	High contrast ratio		Next generation of IPS-Pro
IPS alpha next gen	IPS-Pro	2010	High contrast ratio		

LG IPS technology development
Name	Nickname	Year	Remarks
Horizontal IPS	H-IPS	2007	Improves contrast ratio by twisting electrode plane layout. Also introduces an optional Advanced True White polarizing film from NEC, to make white look more natural. This is used in professional/photography LCDs.
Enhanced IPS	E-IPS	2009	Wider aperture for light transmission, enabling the use of lower-power, cheaper backlights. Improves diagonal viewing angle and further reduce response time to 5ms.
Professional IPS	P-IPS	2010	Offer 1.07 billion colors (10-bit color depth). More possible orientations per sub-pixel (1024 as opposed to 256) and produces a better true color depth.
Advanced High Performance IPS	AH-IPS	2011	Improved color accuracy, increased resolution and PPI, and greater light transmission for lower power consumption.

=== Advanced fringe field switching (AFFS) ===
This is an LCD technology derived from the IPS by Boe-Hydis of Korea. Known as fringe field switching (FFS) until 2003, advanced fringe field switching is a technology similar to IPS or S-IPS offering superior performance and color gamut with high luminosity. Color shift and deviation caused by light leakage is corrected by optimizing the white gamut, which also enhances white/grey reproduction. AFFS is developed by Hydis Technologies Co., Ltd, Korea (formally Hyundai Electronics, LCD Task Force).

In 2004, Hydis Technologies Co., Ltd licensed its AFFS patent to Japan's Hitachi Displays. Hitachi is using AFFS to manufacture high end panels in their product line. In 2006, Hydis also licensed its AFFS to Sanyo Epson Imaging Devices Corporation.

Hydis introduced AFFS+ which improved outdoor readability in 2007.

=== Multi-domain vertical alignment (MVA) ===
It achieved pixel response which was fast for its time, wide viewing angles, and high contrast at the cost of brightness and color reproduction. Modern MVA panels can offer wide viewing angles (second only to S-IPS technology), good black depth, good color reproduction and depth, and fast response times due to the use of response time compensation (RTC) technologies. When MVA panels are viewed off-perpendicular, colors will shift, but much less than for TN panels.

There are several "next-generation" technologies based on MVA, including AU Optronics' P-MVA and AMVA, as well as Chi Mei Optoelectronics' S-MVA.

=== Patterned vertical alignment (PVA) ===
Less expensive PVA panels often use dithering and FRC, whereas super-PVA (S-PVA) panels all use at least 8 bits per color component and do not use color simulation methods. S-PVA also largely eliminated off-angle glowing of solid blacks and reduced the off-angle gamma shift. Some high-end Sony BRAVIA LCD TVs offer 10-bit and xvYCC color support, for example, the Bravia X4500 series. S-PVA also offers fast response times using modern RTC technologies.

=== Advanced super view (ASV) ===
Advanced super view, also called axially symmetric vertical alignment was developed by Sharp. It is a VA mode where liquid crystal molecules orient perpendicular to the substrates in the off state. The bottom sub-pixel has continuously covered electrodes, while the upper one has a smaller area electrode in the center of the subpixel.

When the field is on, the liquid crystal molecules start to tilt towards the center of the sub-pixels because of the electric field; as a result, a continuous pinwheel alignment (CPA) is formed; the azimuthal angle rotates 360 degrees continuously resulting in an excellent viewing angle. The ASV mode is also called CPA mode.

=== Plane-to-line switching (PLS) ===
A technology developed by Samsung is Super PLS, which bears similarities to IPS panels, has wider viewing angles, better image quality, increased brightness, and lower production costs. PLS technology debuted in the PC display market with the release of the Samsung S27A850 and S24A850 monitors in September 2011.

=== TFT dual-transistor pixel (DTP) or cell technology ===
Patent TFT Store Electronic Systems

TFT dual-transistor pixel or cell technology is a reflective-display technology for use in very-low-power-consumption applications such as electronic shelf labels (ESL), digital watches, or metering. DTP involves adding a secondary transistor gate in the single TFT cell to maintain the display of a pixel during a period of 1s without loss of image or without degrading the TFT transistors over time. By slowing the refresh rate of the standard frequency from 60 Hz to 1 Hz, DTP claims to increase the power efficiency by multiple orders of magnitude.

== Display industry ==
Due to the very high cost of building TFT factories, there are few major OEM panel vendors for large display panels. The glass panel suppliers are as follows:

LCD glass panel suppliers
Panel type	Company	Remarks	Major TV makers
IPS-Pro	Panasonic	Solely for LCD TV markets and known as IPS Alpha Technology Ltd.	Panasonic, Hitachi, Toshiba
H-IPS & P-IPS	LG Display	They also produce other type of TFT panels such as TN for OEM markets such as mobile, monitor, automotive, portable AV and industrial panels.	LG, Philips, BenQ
S-IPS	Hannstar	They also produce other type of TFT panels such as TN for OEM markets such as mobile, monitor, automotive, portable AV and industrial panels.	
S-IPS	Chunghwa Picture Tubes, Ltd.	They also produce other type of TFT panels such as TN for OEM markets such as mobile, monitor, automotive, portable AV and industrial panels.	
A-MVA	AU Optronics	They also produce other type of TFT panels such as TN for OEM markets such as mobile, monitor, automotive, portable AV and industrial panels.	
A-HVA	AU Optronics	They also produce other type of TFT panels such as TN for OEM markets such as mobile, monitor, automotive, portable AV and industrial panels.	
S-MVA	Chi Mei Optoelectronics		
AAS	InnoLux Corporation		
S-PVA			Samsung, Sony
AFFS		For small and medium size special projects.	
ASV	Sharp Corporation	LCD TV and mobile markets	Sharp, Sony
MVA	Sharp Corporation	Solely for LED LCD TV markets	Sharp
HVA	China Star Optoelectionics Technology	HVA and AMOLED	TCL

== Electrical interface ==
External consumer display devices like a TFT LCD feature one or more analog VGA, DVI, HDMI, or DisplayPort interface, with many featuring a selection of these interfaces. Inside external display devices there is a controller board that will convert the video signal using color mapping and image scaling usually employing the discrete cosine transform (DCT) in order to convert any video source like CVBS, VGA, DVI, HDMI, etc. into digital RGB at the native resolution of the display panel. In a laptop the graphics chip will directly produce a signal suitable for connection to the built-in TFT display. A control mechanism for the backlight is usually included on the same controller board.

The low level interface of STN, DSTN, or TFT display panels use either single ended TTL 5 V signal for older displays or TTL 3.3 V for slightly newer displays that transmits the pixel clock, horizontal sync, vertical sync, digital red, digital green, digital blue in parallel. Some models (for example the AT070TN92) also feature input/display enable, horizontal scan direction and vertical scan direction signals.

New and large (>15") TFT displays often use LVDS signaling that transmits the same contents as the parallel interface (Hsync, Vsync, RGB) but will put control and RGB bits into a number of serial transmission lines synchronized to a clock whose rate is equal to the pixel rate. LVDS transmits seven bits per clock per data line, with six bits being data and one bit used to signal if the other six bits need to be inverted in order to maintain DC balance. Low-cost TFT displays often have three data lines and therefore only directly support 18 bits per pixel. Upscale displays have four or five data lines to support 24 bits per pixel (true color) or 30 bits per pixel respectively. Panel manufacturers are slowly replacing LVDS with Internal DisplayPort and Embedded DisplayPort, which allow sixfold reduction of the number of differential pairs.

Backlight intensity is usually controlled by varying a few volts DC, or generating a PWM signal, or adjusting a potentiometer or simply fixed. This in turn controls a high-voltage (1.3 kV) DC-AC inverter or a matrix of LEDs. The method to control the intensity of LED is to pulse them with PWM which can be source of harmonic flicker.

The bare display panel will only accept a digital video signal at the resolution determined by the panel pixel matrix designed at manufacture. Some screen panels will ignore the LSB bits of the color information to present a consistent interface (8 bit -> 6 bit/color x3).

With analogue signals like VGA, the display controller also needs to perform a high speed analog to digital conversion. With digital input signals like DVI or HDMI some simple reordering of the bits is needed before feeding it to the rescaler if the input resolution does not match the display panel resolution.

== Safety ==
Liquid crystals are constantly subjected to toxicity and eco-toxicity testing for any hazard potential. The result is that:

- wastewater from manufacturing is acutely toxic to aquatic life,
- but may have an irritant, corrosive or sensitizing effect in rare cases. Any effects can be avoided by using a limited concentration in mixtures,
- are not mutagenic – neither in bacteria (Ames test) nor in mammalian cells (mouse lymphoma assay or chromosome aberration test),
- are not suspected of being carcinogenic,
- are hazardous to aquatic organisms (bacteria, algae, daphnia, fish),
- do not possess any significant bioaccumulation potential,
- are not easily biodegradable.

The statements are applicable to Merck KGaA as well as its competitors JNC Corporation (formerly Chisso Corporation) and DIC (formerly Dainippon Ink & Chemicals). All three manufacturers have agreed not to introduce any acutely toxic or mutagenic liquid crystals to the market. They cover more than 90 percent of the global liquid crystal market. The remaining market share of liquid crystals, produced primarily in China, consists of older, patent-free substances from the three leading world producers and have already been tested for toxicity by them. As a result, they can also be considered non-toxic.

The complete report is available from Merck KGaA online.

The CCFL backlights used in many LCD monitors contain mercury, which is toxic.

== See also ==
- Burst dimming
- Computer monitor
- History of display technology
- LED display
- Liquid crystal
- LCD television
- Transflective liquid-crystal display, for adaptation to environment brightness
- List of flat panel display manufacturers
