= LG.Philips Displays =

Electronics company

- Type: Joint Venture
- Industry: Consumer electronics
- Founded: 2001; 25 years ago
- Defunct: 2007; 19 years ago
- Fate: Bankruptcy
- Headquarters: Hong Kong
- Area served: Worldwide
- Key people: Mr. Jeong IL Son(CEO), Mr. Paul Verhagen(CFO), Mr. Wiebo Jan Vaartjes(CSO), Mr. Soo Dyeog Han(COO)
- Products: Cathode-ray tubes, Deflection Yokes and related materials
- Revenue: ▼US$2 Billion (2005)
- Net income: ▼US$618 million (2005)
- Owner: LG Electronics, Philips
- Number of employees: 17,000 (2006)
- Website: LG.Philips Displays

LP Displays
- Industry: Consumer electronics
- Founded: 2007; 19 years ago
- Defunct: 2008; 18 years ago
- Fate: Liquidation
- Headquarters: Hong Kong
- Area served: Worldwide
- Key people: Mr. Jeong IL Son(CEO), Mr. Deok Sik Moon(CFO), Mr. JM Park(CSO), Mr. Soo Dyeog Han(COO)
- Products: Cathode-ray tubes, deflection yokes and related materials
- Number of employees: 11,000 (2007)
- Website: LP Displays

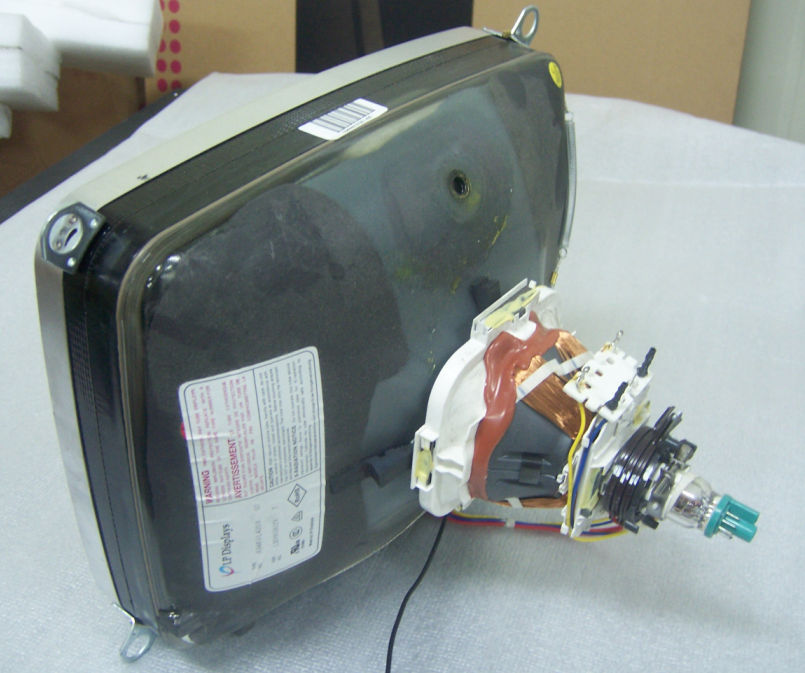
A CRT made by LP Displays

LG.Philips Displays was a joint venture created in 2001 by LG Electronics of South Korea and Philips Electronics of the Netherlands in response to the maturing cathode-ray tube (CRT) market. It primarily manufactured CRTs used in traditional television sets. It was the world's largest manufacturer of CRTs.

These two companies also operated another joint venture, LG.Philips LCD, which focused on LCD panels used in flat panel television sets and laptop computers.

As of 2006, the company had run into bankruptcy and restarted under the same name with investments of a third party (JP Morgan). LG.Philips LCD was not affected by this bankruptcy.

LG.Philips Displays shares were sold in the beginning of March 2007. The company name was changed to LP Displays on 1 April 2007. LP is a historic reference to the old parent companies LG and Philips. The company ended operations in December 2008 due to voluntary liquidation.
