= Time-multiplexed optical shutter =

Time multiplexed optical shutter (TMOS) is a flat panel display technology developed, patented and commercialized by Uni-Pixel Displays, Inc. TMOS is based on the principles of total internal reflection (TIR), frustration of TIR (FTIR) and field sequential colour generation (FSC). This combination of features make it suitable for applications such as mobile phones, televisions and signalling systems.

== Components ==
A TMOS display system consists of a group of sub-systems

- the illumination system; colour generation is based on the conventional tristimulus model, so the system comprises a group of red, green and blue LEDs
- a Light guide , of high quality optical glass. The illumination system is attached to one of its edges and the other three edges are covered with mirrors to keep the reflective light inside the guide.
- a drive control at the individual pixel level, a simple variable capacitor architecture that works as an optical shutter for each pixel in the system. The capacitor consists on two conductive parallel planes: a transparent conductor on the light guide and a thin continuous layer of conductive material placed inside the active layer.
- the Opcuity active layer, the characteristic part of TMOS technology. It includes a base carrier film, a conductor and micro-optic structures that define the light output performance of the display system. These structures are facing the light guide and there are so small that there are hundreds for each pixel. of them.
- the Drive control circuitry system. The initial prototype has all of the control logic programmed in a FPGA processor.

A TMOS unit is arranged as a set of layers placed atop another in the following order: the light guide, a transparent conductive layer, a TFT structure and the Opcuity active layer which includes a conductive layer.

== Operating principle ==
1. The illumination system emits periodically red, green and blue light, each colour cycles for an equal period of time in a very high frequency.
2. The coloured light enters inside de guide light, the mirrored edges cause a continual TIR reflections producing a highly uniform of light energy within the light guide.
3. The light is trapped in the light guide until a voltage differential is created between the two conductive layers of the capacitor at any pixel area. When it happens the two conductive planes attract each other via Coulomb attraction.
4. The Opcuity active layer is the only moving part of TMOS and it is pulled down until it touches the light guide. Then, the specific pixel is activated and the light escaped through it due to the phenomenon frustration of total internal reflection (FTIR).
5. When the voltage differential disappears, the active layer returns to its initial position and the light is trapped again in the light guide.

When the two conductive layers are in contact is said that the pixel is open or active (ON), when the layers are separated then the pixel is closed or inactive (OFF) . The duration of the charge determines the amount of time the shutter is open or closed. To generate images displays, the previous process is specific for each pixel. The color generation is based on the field sequential colour (FSC) system.

== Colour generation ==
Traditional displays use three part pixel, each pixel is created by displaying different intensities of three dots (red, blue and green) so close together that the human eye perceives them as a single colour. This technique takes advantage of the spatial additive colour. However, TMOS technology is based on temporal additive colour, it exploits the temporal resolving power of the human visual system. Red, green and blue light bursts are emitted at sufficiently high frequency that the human eye only perceive a single colours. Different durations of each burst, create different colours.

In TMOS the emitting duration of each burst is the same for the three colors, but the amount of time that each pixel stays open or closed can be only a percentage of the total time controlled by the quantity of the TFT charge (amount of time that the active layer is in contact with the light guide). Therefore, each coloured pixel is generated combining the precise time that each pixel is kept open for each colour burst.

Depending on the combination, a million of colours can be created. For instance:

To get white the pixel remains open the 100% of the total time for each burst and for black each pixel is closed the entire time.:To produce grey, the pixel should be active half of the total time for each burst (when the three values of the three components are equal, a grey is produced)
To create red, the pixel must be closed during blue and green burst, the percentage of the red cycle the pixel is open determines the shade of red.

== General features ==
- Brightness: 1400 cd/m^{2} in a 12.1-inch display with 176° viewing angle at 13.2 watts. Even, it can achieve values of 3.430 cd/m^{2} at 30 watts.
- Night vision: Because the red LED is controlled independently, there is no necessity to add any infrared filter to achieve night vision compatibility.
- Resolution: TMOS can achieve 1/4 mm dot pitch due to its unicellular pixel structure.
- Viewing angle: Without additional steering optics angles as narrow as 25° × 12° (12.5° left, 12.5° right, 6° up, 6° down) can be achieved.
- Grey levels: 24 bits or 36 bits for special inherent systems. The grey levels for monochromatic infrared are three times the primary colour gray scale for visible operation.
- Dimming range: 34 dB
- Video Capability: 60 frames/second
- Shock and vibration: TMOS has important resistance to mechanical stresses during operation as the applied forces are distributed globally and not locally at the individual pixels. The low mass and the lamination structure of the active layer mitigate the resonances and modes.
- Mean time between failures: The first components it is expected to fail in a TMOS technology is the illumination system. LEDs usually have 100,000 hours' MTBF under continuous operation; as TMOS uses LEDs at 1/3 duty cycle, the maximum expected MTBF is 300,000 hours.

=== Advantages ===
TMOS technology offers many advantages over other popular technologies like LCD, plasma and OLED.

Simplicity: The simple TMOS structure brings most of the others advantages. The five layers of an LCD become only one in TMOS. This involves a simpler manufacturing process and increases the performance.
Energy efficiency: TMOS is ten times more efficient than an LCD. In LCD less than 5–10% of the energy input is transmitted as light output, while in TMOS 61% percent of the energy is transmitted. Low power consumption makes TMOS ideal for battery-powered applications.
Low cost: Because of the TMOS simple structure the manufacturing process becomes simpler and the total cost lower. TMOS devices can be 60% cheaper than the others.
Good contrast and brightness: TMOS display systems produce 10% more brilliant images and with a better contrast ratio (4500:1) comparing with LCD (2500:1) and others (700:1)
Mean time between failures: TMOS life could achieve 300,000 hours, overcoming the 10,000 hours of OLED, 30,000 of plasma displays, 40,000 hours of CTRS and the 100,000 hours of LCD.
Scalability: Scale flexibility is another important characteristic. TMOS is the first technology capable of supporting different configurations and sizes up to 110″. Until now, OLED achieved 20″, LCD 54″ and plasma 72″.
Variety of applications: Traditional displays have specific applications: OLED for mobiles, plasma for television and LCD for computers. Thanks to scalability, TMOS will be suitable for mobile, television and computers displays.

=== Disadvantages ===
The main disadvantage is the necessity of a very high velocity; if it is insufficient a rainbow effect could appear at blink.

== Future developments ==
In the future, it aims to improve efficiency and features of that kind of screens. Some of these improvements are going to be a new guide light material, polycarbonate or flexible polymer, and the enlargement of the LED's gamut. What is more, the TFTs structure is going to be eliminated and a system of a stripes (rows and columns) called Simple Matrix will provide individual pixel control.

The following features are being investigated for TMOS displays:

Flexibility, allowing radius of curvature up to 20 times the displays thickness. This characteristic will enable the creation of photo-realistic images, the development of "home theatres" that surround the viewer like IMAX screens.
Readability in bright sunlight so they could be used for road and highway signs, tradeshows...etc.
Transparency, displays could have a transparent rear therefore, they could be used as windows from the inside and as displays from the outside.
