= InnoLux Corporation =

Taiwanese electronics producer

Innolux Corporation 群創光電股份有限公司
- Type: Public (TWSE: 3481)
- Industry: TFT LCD
- Founded: 14 January 2003
- Headquarters: Zhunan, Miaoli County, Taiwan
- Key people: Hsing-Chien Tuan (chairman and CEO)
- Number of employees: 56,000

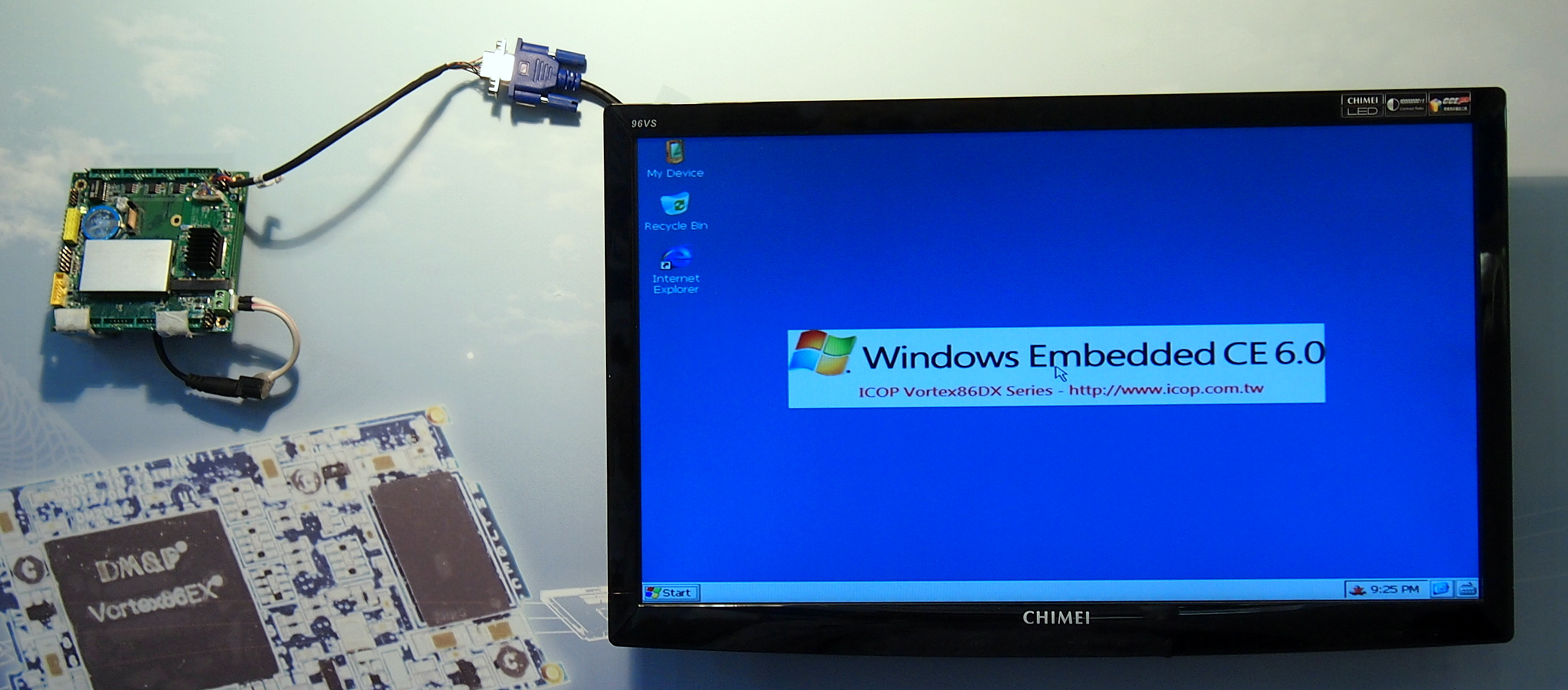
Innolux/Chimei-Display with Windows-Embedded PC at Embedded World Tradefair 2014

Innolux Corporation (Chinese: 群創光電股份有限公司; pinyin: Qúnchuàng Guāngdiàn Gǔfèn Yǒuxiàn Gōngsī) is a company producing TFT LCD panels, established in 2003 and located in Taiwan.

== Overview ==
Innolux Display Corp., following its merger with Chi Mei Optoelectronics and TPO Displays Corp., began operating under the name Innolux Corporation (INX) in March 2010.

Products include TFT-LCD panel modules and touch panels, including TV panels, desktop monitors and notebook computer panels, AV & mobile panels, Innolux is a TFT-LCD supplier to information technology and consumer electronics product makers worldwide.

Innolux's largest customers include Toshiba, Samsung, Philips, LG, Sony, Panasonic, Sharp, Lenovo, HP, Broteko, Dell & HDMIPI.

In 2018 Innolux had the third highest R&D spending of any listed Taiwanese company. Innolux's investment of NT$11.3 billion represented 4.1 percent of its total sales. Innolux also investing NT$41.7 billion in fixed assets, the second most of any listed Taiwanese company. In April 2024, Innolux reported its 8th quarter of losses.

== History ==
- Chi Mei Optoelectronics is established on 6 August 1998.
- The department of TPO Displays is established on 24 December 1999.
- Innolux Display Corp. is originally established on 14 January 2003.
- Innolux Display Corp. publicly listed its shares on the Taiwan Stock Exchange on 24 October 2006.
- 10/05/2009 Innolux Display Corp. and TPO Displays carry out merger via a share swap arrangement
- 11/14/2009 Innolux Display Corp. and Chi Mei Optoelectronics carry out merger via a share swap arrangement, with Innolux Display Corp.
- 03/18/2010 Innolux Display Corp. announces the completion of merger with Chi Mei Optoelectronics and TPO Displays.
- 03/30/2010 Innolux Display Corp. officially changes its name to Chimei Innolux Corporation.
- 03/16/2012 The board of directors elected Hsing Chien Tuan as new chairman of the board.
- 12/26/2012 Chimei Innolux Corporation changes its name to “Innolux Corporation”.
- 01/14/2013 Innolux Corp. to hold the 10-year anniversary celebration.

== See also ==
- List of companies of Taiwan
