= AUO Corporation =

Taiwanese optoelectronics company

- Native name: 友達光電
- Type: Public company
- Traded as: TWSE: 2409
- Industry: Electronics
- Founded: 12 August 1996
- Headquarters: Hsinchu, Taiwan
- Key people: Paul SL Peng (Chairman and Group Chief Strategy Officer); Frank Ko(Chief Executive Officer and President)
- Revenue: NT$247 billion (2022)
- Number of employees: ▲38,000 (2022)

Chinese name
- Traditional Chinese: 友達光電
- Simplified Chinese: 友达光电
Transcriptions
Standard Mandarin
- Hanyu Pinyin: yǒu dá guāng diàn
- Website: auo.com

AUO Corporation (AUO; Chinese: 友達光電) is a Taiwanese company that specialises in optoelectronics. It was formed in September 2001 by the merger of Acer Display Technology, Inc. (the predecessor of AUO, established in 1996) and Unipac Optoelectronics Corporation. AUO offers display panels, and in recent years expanded its business to smart retail, smart transportation, general health, solar energy, circular economy and smart manufacturing service.

AUO employs 38,000 people.

== History ==
- August 1996 Acer Display Technology, Inc. (the predecessor of AUO) was founded
- September 2000 Listed at Taiwan Stock Exchange Corporation
- September 2001 Merged with Unipac Optoelectronics Corporation to form AUO
- October 2006 Merged with Quanta Display Inc.
- December 2008 Entered solar business
- June 2009 Joint venture with Changhong in Sichuan, China to set up module plant
- April 2010 Joint venture with TCL in China to set up module plant
- July 2010 Acquired AFPD Pte., Ltd.("AFPD"), subsidiary of Toshiba Mobile Display Co., Ltd. in Singapore
- February 2012 OLED strategic alliance formed with Idemitsu in Japan
- April 2014 Initiated new model of solar power plant operation by founding Star River Energy Corporation
- May 2014 CSR Report acquired Taiwan's first GRI G4 certificate among the manufacturing industry
- December 2015 Launched Taiwan's first process water full-recycling system
- December 2020 AUO 9.4-inch high resolution flexible micro LED display technology honored with 2020 Innovative Product Award from Hsinchu Science Park
- May 2021 Established AUO Display Plus, Industrial and Commercial Display Subsidiary of AUO
- October 2023 AUO acquired Behr-Hella Thermocontrol for €600 million (approximately NT$20.4 billion)

== Controversies ==
In September 2012, AUO was sentenced to pay a US$500 million criminal fine for its participation in a five-year conspiracy to fix the prices of thin-film transistor LCD panels sold worldwide. Its American subsidiary and two former top executives were also sentenced. The two executives were sentenced to prison and fined for their roles in the conspiracy. The $500 million fine matches the largest fine imposed against a company for violating U.S. antitrust laws. In July 2014, the Ninth Circuit rejected AUO's appeal of the fine.

== Shareholding and subsidiaries ==
- Lextar Electronics Corporation
- Qisda Corporation
- Darwin Precision Corporation
- Daxin Materials Corporation
- AUO Crystal Corporation
- Toppan CFI
- Fargen Power Corporation

== See also ==
- List of companies of Taiwan
