= In-plane switching =

Screen technology used for liquid crystal displays

In-plane switching (IPS) is a screen technology used for liquid-crystal displays (LCDs). In IPS, liquid crystal molecules are sandwiched between, and aligned parallel to, two panels (planes) of glass substrate. The molecules are reoriented by applying electric field, while remaining essentially parallel to the surfaces to produce an image. It was designed to remedy issues of poor viewing angle and color reproduction of the twisted nematic field effect (TN) matrix LCDs prevalent in the late 1980s.

== History ==
Computer monitors started utilizing active matrix TFT LCD panels in the 1980s and early 1990s, as an alternative technology to the cathode ray tube. These early LCD displays suffered from inverted grayscale, loss of contrast and color reproduction accuracy when viewed from extreme angles, and had significant display motion blur due to poor response time. IPS and vertical alignment (VA) are designed to alleviate these issues.

An early experimental IPS-LCD is described in a 1974 patent. It used inter-digitated electrodes on only one glass substrate, to produce electric field essentially parallel to the glass substrates. However, the inventor was not able to implement IPS-LCDs with superior quality to contemporary TN displays.

After thorough analysis, details of advantageous molecular arrangements were filed in Germany by Guenter Baur et al. and patented in various countries including the US on 9 January 1990. The Fraunhofer Society in Freiburg, where the inventors worked, assigned these patents to Merck KGaA, Darmstadt, Germany.

Shortly thereafter, Hitachi of Japan filed patents on improvements to the technology. In 1992, engineers at Hitachi worked out various practical details of the IPS technology to interconnect the thin-film transistor array as a matrix and to avoid undesirable stray fields in between pixels. Hitachi also improved the viewing angle dependence further by optimizing the shape of the electrodes (Super IPS). NEC and Hitachi became early manufacturers of active-matrix addressed LCDs based on the IPS technology. This is a milestone for implementing large-screen LCDs having acceptable visual performance for flat-panel computer monitors and television screens. In 1996, Samsung developed the optical patterning technique that enables multi-domain LCD. Multi-domain and in-plane switching subsequently remain the dominant LCD designs through 2006.

Later, LG Display and other South Korean, Japanese, and Taiwanese LCD manufacturers adopted IPS technology.

IPS technology is widely used in panels for TVs, tablet computers, and smartphones. In particular, most IBM products marketed as Flexview from 2004 to 2008 have IPS LCDs with CCFL backlighting, and all Apple Inc. products marketed with the label Retina Display feature IPS LCDs with LED backlighting since 2010.

Hitachi IPS technology development
| Name | Nickname | Year | Advantage | Transmittance or contrast ratio | Remarks |
|---|---|---|---|---|---|
| Super TFT | IPS | 1996 | Wide viewing angle | 100/100; Base level | Most panels also support true 8-bit-per-channel colour. These improvements came at the cost of a lower response time, initially about 50 ms. IPS panels were also extremely expensive. |
| Super-IPS | S-IPS | 1998 | Colour shift free | 100/137 | IPS has since been superseded by S-IPS (Super-IPS, Hitachi in 1998), which has all the benefits of IPS technology with the addition of improved pixel refresh timing. |
| Advanced Super-IPS | AS-IPS | 2002 | High transmittance | 130/250 | AS-IPS, also developed by Hitachi in 2002, improves substantially on the contrast ratio of traditional S-IPS panels to the point where they are second only to some S-PVAs. |
| IPS-Provectus | IPS-Pro | 2004 | High contrast ratio | 137/313 | The latest panel from IPS Alpha Technology with a wider colour gamut and contrast ratio matching PVA and ASV displays without off-angle glowing. |
| IPS Alpha | IPS-Pro | 2008 | High contrast ratio | | Next generation of IPS-Pro |
| IPS Alpha Next-Gen | IPS-Pro | 2010 | High contrast ratio | | |

LG IPS technology development
| Name | Nickname | Year | Remarks |
|---|---|---|---|
| Horizontal IPS | H-IPS | 2007 | Improves contrast ratio by twisting electrode plane layout. Also introduces an optional Advanced True White polarizing film from NEC, to make white look more natural. This is used in professional/photography LCDs. |
| Enhanced IPS | E-IPS | 2009 | Wider aperture for light transmission, enabling the use of lower-power, cheaper backlights. Improves diagonal viewing angle and further reduce response time to 5 ms. |
| Professional IPS | P-IPS | 2010 | Offer 1.07 billion colours (30-bit colour depth). More possible orientations per sub-pixel (1024 as opposed to 256) and produces a better true colour depth. |
| Advanced High Performance IPS | AH-IPS | 2011 | Improved colour accuracy, increased resolution and PPI, and greater light transmission for lower power consumption. |

== Technology ==
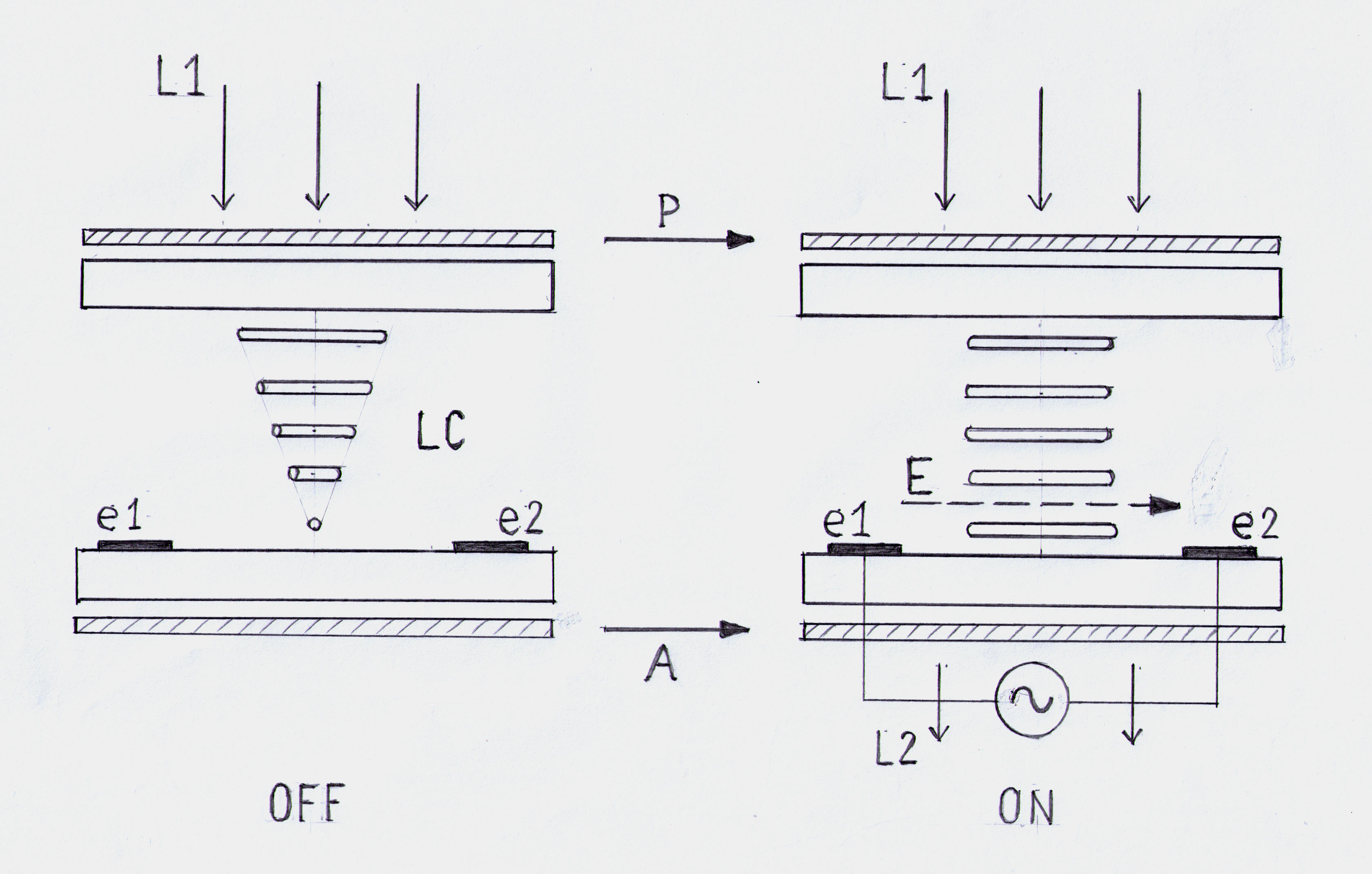
Schematic diagram IPS liquid crystal display

=== Implementation ===
In this case, both linear polarizing filters P and A have their axes of transmission in the same direction. To obtain the 90 degree twisted nematic structure of the LC layer between the two glass plates without an applied electric field (OFF state), the inner surfaces of the glass plates are treated to align the bordering LC molecules at a right angle. This molecular structure is practically the same as in TN LCDs. However, the arrangement of the electrodes e1 and e2 is different. Electrodes are in the same plane and on a single glass plate, so they generate an electric field essentially parallel to this plate. The diagram is not to scale: the LC layer is only a few micrometers thick, very thin compared with the distance between the electrodes.

The LC molecules have a positive dielectric anisotropy and align themselves with their long axis parallel to an applied electrical field. In the OFF state (shown on the left), entering light L1 becomes linearly polarized by polarizer P. The twisted nematic LC layer rotates the polarization axis of the passing light by 90 degrees, so that ideally no light passes through polarizer A. In the ON state, a sufficient voltage is applied between electrodes and a corresponding electric field E is generated that realigns the LC molecules as shown on the right of the diagram. Here, light L2 can pass through polarizer A.

In practice, other schemes of implementation exist with a different structure of the LC molecules – for example without any twist in the OFF state. As both electrodes are on the same substrate, they take more space than TN matrix electrodes. This also reduces contrast and brightness.

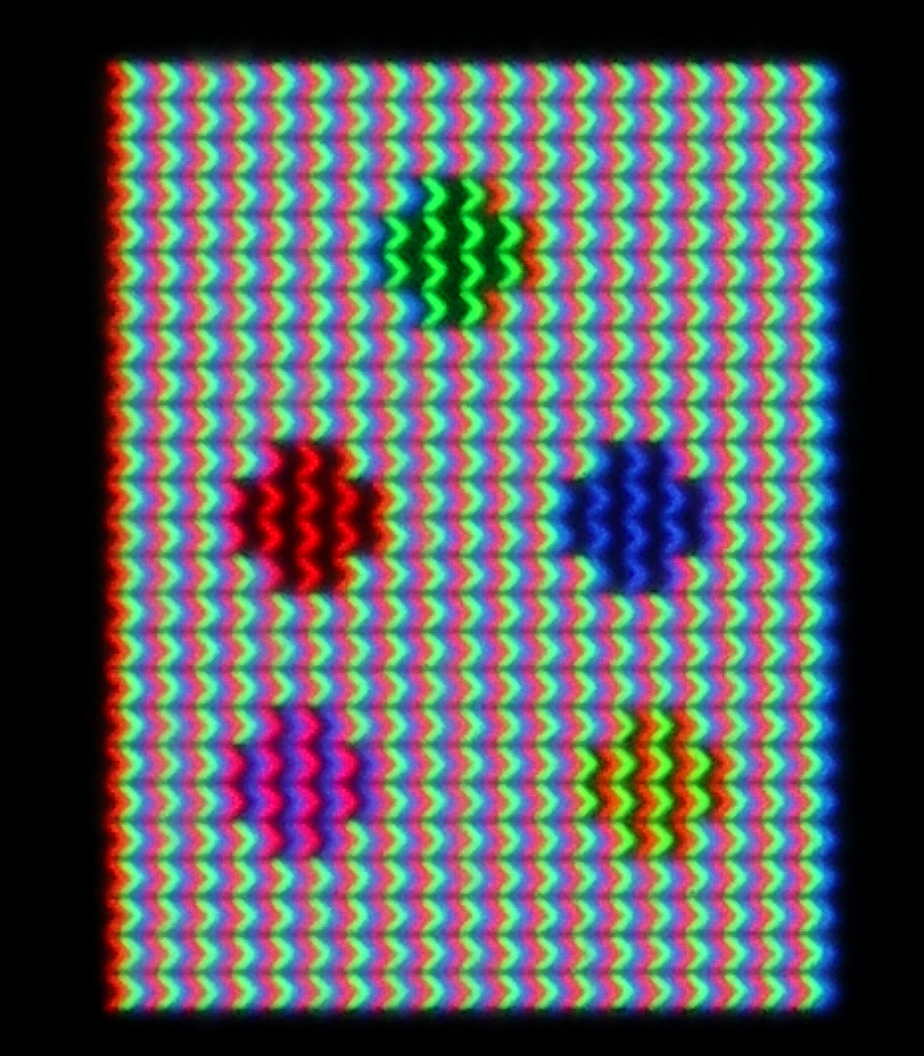
This pixel layout is found in S-IPS LCDs. A chevron shape is used to widen the viewing cone.

=== Advantages ===
- IPS panels display consistent, accurate color from all viewing angles. A comparison in 2014 of IPS vs. TN panels concerning color consistency under different viewing angles can be seen on the website of Japan Display Inc. Also, compared to TN panels, IPS panels can display more color spaces.
- Unlike TN LCDs, IPS panels do not lighten or show tailing when touched. This is important for touch-screen devices, such as smartphones and tablet computers.
- IPS panels offer clear and razor-sharp images without reflections, a wide viewing range, stable response time and better coloring.

=== Disadvantages ===
Compared to TN displays, IPS ones may consume more power, cost more to manufacture, have slower response times, and suffer from uneven backlight brightness ("backlight bleeding") more easily.

=== Other names ===
Samsung Electronics's use the marketing term Super PLS (Plane-to-Line Switching) to refer to IPS panel technologies with similar features and performance characteristics to LG's offering.

== See also ==
- Computer monitor
- e-paper
- LCD TV
- Liquid-crystal display
- Smart watch
- TFT LCD
