= Electronic visual display =

Display device for presentation of images, video, or text transmitted electronically

An electronic visual display is a display device that can display images, video, or text that is transmitted electronically. Electronic visual displays include television sets, computer monitors, and digital signage. They are ubiquitous in mobile computing applications like tablet computers, smartphones, and information appliances. Many electronic visual displays are informally referred to as screens, and those that also contain some means of touch input are called touchscreens.

Starting in the early 2000s, flat-panel displays began to dominate the industry, as cathode ray tubes (CRT) were phased out, especially for computer applications. Starting in the mid 2010s, curved display panels began to be used in televisions, computer monitors, and smartphones.

== Types ==
There are various technologies used for electronic visual displays:

- Liquid-crystal display (LCD) including LED-backlit LCD
- LED display
  - OLED
  - AMOLED
- Plasma display
- Quantum dot display
- Electroluminescent display

An overhead projector can be considered a type of electronic visual display.

Additionally, CRTs were widely used in the past and microLED displays are under development.

== Classification ==
Electronic visual displays present visual information according to the electrical input signal (analog or digital) either by emitting light (then they are called active displays) or, alternatively, by modulating available light during the process of reflection or transmission (light modulators are called passive displays).

Electronic visual displays
	Active displays	Passive displays
	present visual information by emitting light	present visual information by modulating light
Principle	Liquid-crystal display (LCD) + backlight (this combination is considered an active display)	LCD
Example	LCD TV screen, LCD computer monitor	LCD watch (reflective) see LCD classification
Principle	Cathodoluminescence	Electrophoresis also see Electronic paper
Example	Cathode-ray tube (CRT); Field-emission display (FED); Vacuum fluorescent display (VFD); Surface-conduction electron-emitter display (SED)	Research & manufacturing:
Principle	Electroluminescence	Electrochromism
Example	(thin or thick film) electro-luminescence (EL) (inorganic or organic) light-emitting diode (LED, OLED) gas-discharge display (Nixie tube)	Research & manufacturing:
Principle	Photoluminescence	Electrowetting
Example	Plasma display panel (PDP)	Research & manufacturing:
Principle	Incandescence	Electromechanical modulation
Example	Numitron, a 7-segment numerical display tube	flap display flip-disk display digital micromirror device (DMD); Interferometric modulator display (IMOD); FTIR (unipixel)

== Display mode of observation ==
Electronic visual displays can be observed directly (direct view display) or the displayed information can be projected to a screen (transmissive or reflective screen). This usually happens with smaller displays at a certain magnification.

Display modes of observation
Direct view display	Projection display
transmissive mode of operation	front-projection (with reflective screen) e.g. video projector
reflective mode of operation	rear-projection (with transmissive screen) e.g. rear-projection television screen
transflective mode of operation (e.g. transflective LCD)	retinal projection (with or without combiner) e.g. head-mounted display

A different kind of projection display is the class of "laser-projection displays", where the image is built up sequentially either via line by line scanning or by writing one complete column at a time. For that purpose one beam is formed from three lasers operating at the primary colors, and this beam is scanned electro-mechanically (galvanometer scanner, micro-mirror array)) or electro-acousto-optically.

== Layout of picture elements ==
Depending on the shape and on the arrangement of the picture elements of a display, either fixed information can be displayed (symbols, signs), simple numerals (7-segment layout) or arbitrary shapes can be formed (dot-matrix displays).

Layout of picture elements
Segmented displays characters, numbers and symbols of fixed shape (may be multiplex addressed); The following layouts are well known: Seven-segment display Fourteen-segment display Sixteen-segment display	Dot-matrix displays sub-pixels are arranged in a regular 2-dimensional array (multiplex addressing required); arbitrary shapes can be formed and displayed

== Emission and control of colors ==
Colors can be generated by selective emission, by selective absorption, transmission or by selective reflection.

Color emission and control
additive mixing primary colors add up to produce white light	subtractive mixing filters, dyes, pigments (e.g.printing) subtract (absorb) parts of white light
temporal mixing (additive) e.g. rotating primary color filter wheel in projectors	spatial mixing (additive) closely spaced sub-pixels
spatio temporal color mixing combined spatial and temporal mixing
arrangement of sub-pixels for additive color mixing see sub-pixel arrangements 1 see sub-pixel arrangements 2 see sub-pixel arrangements 3	subtractive color mixing does not require special sub-pixel arrangements all components (e.g. filters) have to be in the same path of light.
Examples: stripe delta-nabla PenTile arrangement, e.g. RGB+White	

== Addressing modes ==
Each sub-pixel of a display device must be selected (addressed) in order to be energized in a controlled way.

Addressing modes (selection of picture elements)
direct addressing each individual picture element has electrical connections to the driving electronics.	multiplexed addressing several picture elements have common electrical connections to the driving electronics, e. g.. row and column electrodes when the picture elements are arranged in a two dimensional matrix.
active matrix addressing active electronic elements added in order to improve selection of picture elements.: thin-film diodes (TFDs); thin-film transistors (TFTs); amorphous silicon (a-Si); polycrystalline silicon (p-Si); monocrystalline silicon	passive matrix addressing the nonlinearity of the display effect (e.g. LCD, LED)is used to realize the addressing of individual pixels in multiplex addressing. In this mode only a quite limited number of lines can be addressed. In the case of (STN-)LCDs this maximum is at ~240, but at the expense of a considerable reduction of contrast.
The matrix of active electronic elements can be used in transmissive mode of operation (high transmittance required) or a non-transparent active matrix can be used for reflective LCDs (e.g. liquid crystal on silicon (LCOS)).|

== Display driving modes ==
Driving modes (activation of picture elements)
voltage driving activation of pixels by voltage (e.g. LCD field effects). If the current is low enough this mode may be the basis for displays with very low power requirements (e.g. μW for LCDs without backlight).	current driving activation of pixels by electric current (e.g. LED).

== See also ==
- 3D display
- Head-mounted display
- ISO 13406-2
