= AO 0235+164 =

BL Lac object in the constellation Aries

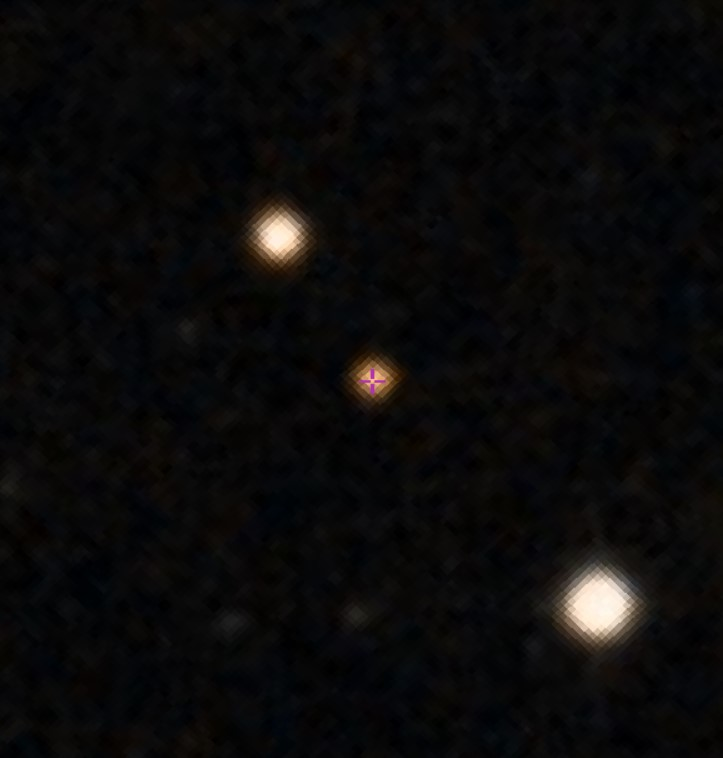
- The BL Lac object AO 0235+164

Observation data (J2000.0 epoch)
- Constellation: Aries
- Right ascension: 02^{h} 38^{m} 38.930^{s}
- Declination: +16° 36′ 59.275″
- Redshift: 0.940000
- Heliocentric radial velocity: 281,805 km/s
- Distance: 7.537 Gly
- Apparent magnitude (V): 15.5
- Apparent magnitude (B): 16.46

Characteristics
- Type: blazar;FRSQ, BL Lac
- Notable features: Optical variable blazar

Other designations
- LEDA 2823185, PKS 0235+164, NVSS J023838+163658, 4FGL J0238.6+1637, OD +160

AO 0235+164 is a BL Lacertae object (BL Lac object) located in the constellation of Aries, 7.5 billion light years from Earth. It has a redshift of 0.94. It was first discovered as an astronomical radio source by astronomers between 1967 and 1970, and formally identified with a red stellar object in 1975. Because of its extreme variability at both radio and optical wavelengths across the electromagnetic spectrum, this BL Lac object has been referred to as a blazar.

== Description ==
AO 0235+164 is shown to be in a flaring state. It also had two major outbursts in 1975 and 1987. Another outburst occurred in 1997 the duration of which was on the order of 800 days with a maximum luminosity of 9.86 × 10^{47} erg s^{−1} suggesting a microlensing event scenario.

During a Fermi Large Area Telescope multi-wavelength observation between August 2008 and February 2009, the blazar underwent a high state showing intense gamma ray activity before falling to a low state. It displayed near-infrared flares in 2014 and 2017. By 2020, AO 0235+164 had brightened again, displaying an optical flare that reached its peak in 2021. However, when compared to previous flares, it is shown weaker despite emission at all wavelengths increasing from gamma rays to millimeter waves and its light curve exhibiting a multi-peak structure with sharp variability at high energies.

The optical brightness of AO 0235+164 is known to vary across different time scales ranging from a few hours in optical to a long period of time in radio. During the last three nights in January 2024, its brightness level significantly increased rapidly over 2 magnitudes in the R-band.

The source of AO 0235+164 is substantially resolved, however no structural position angle is distinguished . Additionally AO 0235+165 also contains a compact core with a weak extended structure located north-northwest from it, indicating a result of a small viewing angle found for the source. A component can be seen 0.7 mas away from the core with a position angle of = 7°. The radio components also have superluminal velocities reaching as fast as β ~ 30h^{−1} (h = H/100 km Mpc^{−1} s^{−1}).

AO 0235+164 contains a supermassive black hole in its center. Based on analysis of a broad magnesium spectral line in its spectrum, the mass is 7.9 × 10^{7} M_{☉}. Alternatively, it might also contain a close binary black hole system with estimated similar masses of order of 10^{10} M_{☉} with velocities of 10^{4} and 5 × 10^{3} kilometers per seconds.
