= Privacy screen =

Privacy screen may refer to:

- A room divider, especially one used for privacy while changing.
- A type of monitor filter that makes it difficult for someone other than the user to see the contents of the screen.
