= Super fine TFT =

Display technology

Super fine TFT (SFT) is a NEC display technology that is claimed to provide better viewing angles and pixel response speed than other thin-film transistor (TFT) technologies.
