= Field emitter array =

Form of large-area field electron source

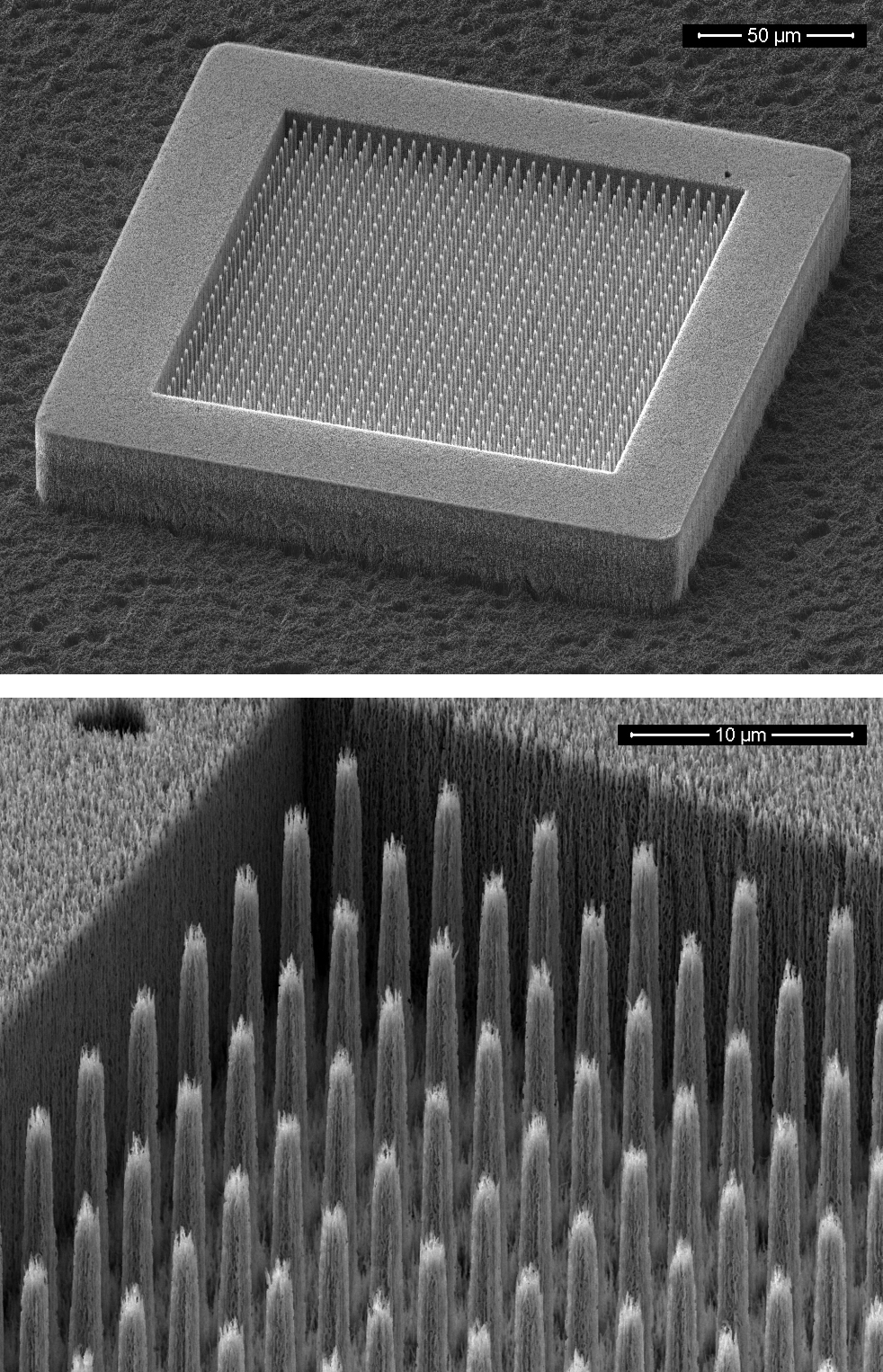
Silicon Carbide (SiC) Field Emitter made by NIST in 2013. It produces a flow of electrons comparable to thermionic emission but without a need for destructive heat. It was made by etching some material away to make a porous structure with a large surface area. As an electron emission point on an individual spike wears out, another is available to replace it, making the array more durable.

A field emitter array (FEA) is a particular form of large-area field electron source. FEAs are prepared on a silicon substrate by lithographic techniques similar to those used in the fabrication of integrated circuits. Their structure consists of many individual, similar, small-field electron emitters, usually organized in a regular two-dimensional pattern. FEAs need to be distinguished from "film" or "mat" type large-area sources, where a thin film-like layer of material is deposited onto a substrate, using a uniform deposition process, in the hope or expectation that (as a result of statistical irregularities in the process) this film will contain a sufficiently large number of individual emission sites.

== Spindt arrays ==
The original field emitter array was the Spindt array, in which the individual field emitters are small sharp molybdenum cones. Each is deposited inside a cylindrical void in an oxide film, with a counterelectrode deposited on the top of the film. The counterelectrode (called the "gate") contains a separate circular aperture for each conical emitter. The device is named after Charles A. Spindt, who developed this technology at SRI International, publishing the first article describing a single emitter tip microfabricated on a wafer in 1968. Spindt, Shoulders and Heynick filed a U.S. Patent in 1970 for a vacuum device comprising an array of emitter tips.

Each individual cone is referred to as a Spindt tip. Because Spindt tips have sharp apices, they can generate a high local electric field using a relatively low gate voltage (less than 100 V). Using lithographic manufacturing techniques, individual emitters can be packed extremely close together, resulting in a high average (or "macroscopic") current density of up to 2×10^{7} A/m^{2}. Spindt-type emitters have a higher emission intensity and a more narrow angular distribution than other FEA technologies.

== nano-Spindt arrays ==
Nano-Spindt arrays represent an evolution of the traditional Spindt-type emitter. Each individual tip is several orders of magnitude smaller; as a result, gate voltages can be lower, since the distance from tip to gate is reduced. In addition, the current extracted from each individual tip is lower, which should result in improved reliability.

== Carbon Nanotube (CNT) arrays ==
An alternative form of FEA is fabricated by creating voids in an oxide film (as for a Spindt array) and then using standard methods to grow one or more carbon nanotubes (CNTs) in each void.

It is also possible to grow "free-standing" CNT arrays.

== Applications ==
Essentially very small electron beam generators, FEAs, have been applied in many different domains. FEAs have been used to create flat panel displays (where they are known as field emission displays (or "nano-emissive displays"). They may also be used in microwave generators, and in RF communications, where they could serve as the cathode in traveling-wave tubes (TWTs).

Recently, there has been renewed interest in using field effect arrays as cold cathodes in X-ray tubes. FEAs offer a number of potential advantages over conventional thermionic cathodes, including low power consumption, instantaneous switching, and independence of current and voltage.

== See also ==
- Field emission display
- Field electron emission
- Vacuum tubes using field electron emitters
- Cold cathode
