= Surface-conduction electron-emitter display =

CRT screen

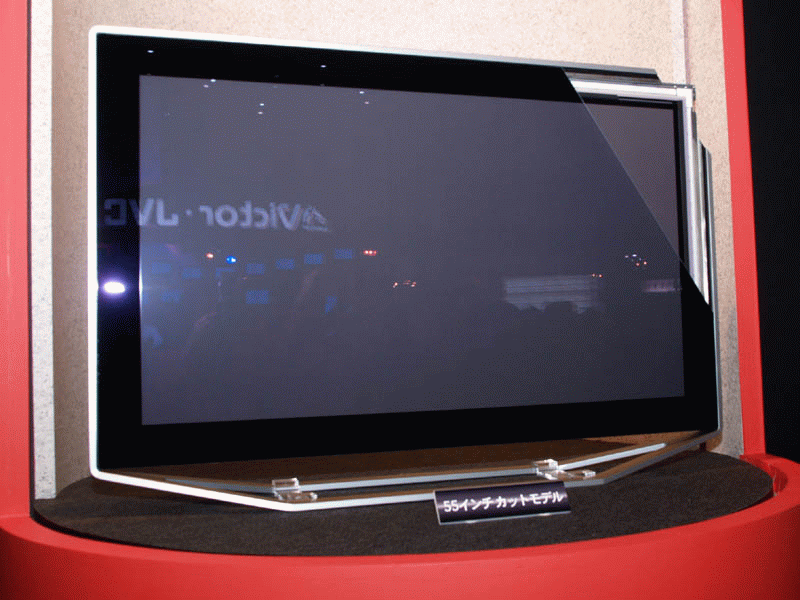
Canon's 36" prototype SED, shown at the 2006 CES

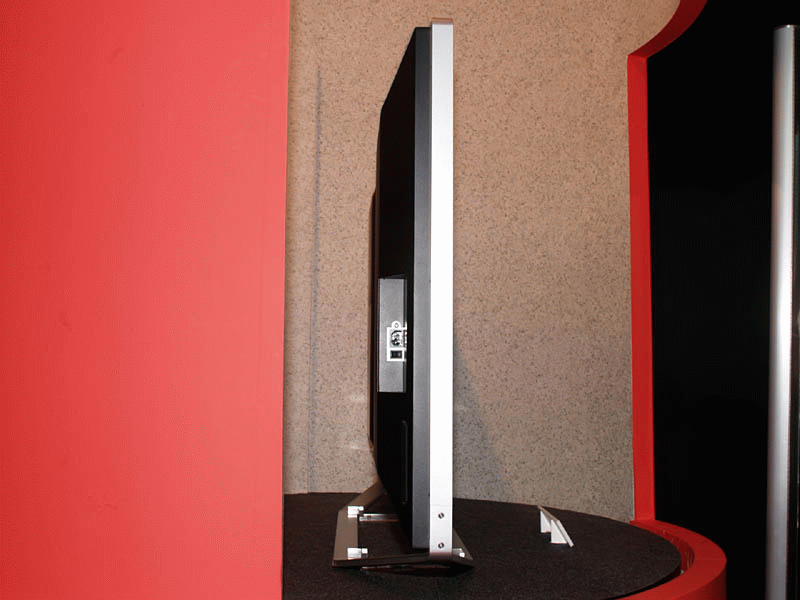
Another view of the same display, showing what was a thin case at the time

A surface-conduction electron-emitter display (SED) is a display technology for flat panel displays developed by a number of companies. SEDs uses nanoscopic-scale electron emitters to energize colored phosphors and produce an image. In a general sense, a SED consists of a matrix of tiny cathode-ray tubes, each "tube" forming a single sub-pixel on the screen, grouped in threes to form red-green-blue (RGB) pixels. SEDs combine the advantages of CRTs, namely their high contrast ratios, wide viewing angles, and very fast response times, with the packaging advantages of LCD and other flat panel displays.

After considerable time and effort in the early and mid-2000s, SED efforts started winding down in 2009 as LCD became the dominant technology. In August 2010, Canon announced they were shutting down their joint effort to develop SEDs commercially, signaling the end of development efforts. SEDs were closely related to another developing display technology, the field-emission display, or FED, differing primarily in the details of the electron emitters. Sony, the main backer of FED, has similarly backed off from their development efforts.

== Description ==
A conventional cathode-ray tube (CRT) is powered by an electron gun, essentially an open-ended vacuum tube. At one end of the gun, electrons are produced by "boiling" them off a metal filament, which requires relatively high currents and consumes a large proportion of the CRT's power. The electrons are then accelerated and focused into a fast-moving beam, flowing forward towards the screen. Electromagnets surrounding the gun end of the tube are used to steer the beam as it travels forward, allowing the beam to be scanned across the screen to produce a 2D display. When the fast-moving electrons strike the phosphor on the back of the screen, light is produced. Color images are produced by painting the screen with spots or stripes of three colored phosphors, each for red, green, and blue (RGB). When viewed from a distance, the spots, known as "sub-pixels," blend together in the eye to produce a single picture element known as a pixel.

The SED replaces the single gun of a conventional CRT with a grid of nanoscopic emitters, one for each sub-pixel of the display. The emitter apparatus consists of a thin slit across which electrons jump when powered with high-voltage gradients. Due to the nanoscopic size of the slits, the required field can correspond to a potential on the order of tens of volts. On the order of 3%, a few of the electrons impact with slit material on the far side and are scattered out of the emitter surface. A second field, applied externally, accelerates these scattered electrons towards the screen. Production of this field requires kilovolt potentials, but is a constant field requiring no switching, so the electronics that produce it are pretty simple.

Each emitter is aligned behind a colored phosphor dot. The accelerated electrons strike the dot and cause it to give off light in a fashion identical to a conventional CRT. Since each dot on the screen is lit by a single emitter, there is no need to steer or direct the beam as there is in a CRT. The quantum tunneling effect, which emits electrons across the slits, is highly non-linear, and the emission process tends to be fully on or off for any given voltage. This allows the selection of particular emitters by powering a single horizontal row on the screen and then powering all the needed vertical columns simultaneously, thereby powering the selected emitters. The half-power received by the rest of the emitters on the row is too small to cause emission, even when combined with voltage leaking from active emitters beside them. This allows SED displays to work without an active matrix of thin-film transistors that LCDs and similar displays require to precisely select every sub-pixel, and further reduces the complexity of the emitter array. However, this also means that changes in voltage cannot be used to control the brightness of the resulting pixels. Instead, the emitters are rapidly turned on and off using pulse-width modulation, so that the total brightness of a spot at any given time can be controlled.

SED screens consist of two glass sheets separated by a few millimeters, the rear layer supporting the emitters and the front the phosphors. The front is easily prepared using methods similar to existing CRT systems; the phosphors are painted onto the screen using a variety of silkscreen or similar technologies and then covered with a thin layer of aluminum to make the screen visibly opaque and provide an electrical return path for the electrons once they strike the screen. In the SED, this layer also serves as the front electrode that accelerates the electrons toward the screen, held at a constant high voltage relative to the switching grid. As is the case with modern CRTs, a dark mask is applied to the glass before the phosphor is painted on to give the screen a dark charcoal gray color and improve the contrast ratio.

Creating the rear layer with the emitters is a multistep process. First, a matrix of silver wires is printed on the screen to form the rows or columns, an insulator is added, and then the columns or rows are deposited on top of that. Electrodes are added into this array, typically using platinum, leaving a gap of about 60 micrometers between the columns. Next, square pads of palladium oxide (PdO) only 20 nanometers thick are deposited into the gaps between the electrodes, connecting them to supply power. A small slit is cut into the pad in the middle by repeatedly pulsing high currents through them. The resulting erosion causes a gap to form. The gap in the pad forms the emitter. The width of the gap has to be tightly controlled to work correctly, which proved challenging to control in practice.

Modern SEDs add another step that greatly eases production. The pads are deposited with a much larger gap between them, as much as 50 nm, which allows them to be added directly using technology adapted from inkjet printers. The entire screen is then placed in an organic gas, and pulses of electricity are sent through the pads. Carbon in the gas is pulled onto the edges of the slit in the PdO squares, forming thin films that extend vertically off the tops of the gaps and grow toward each other at a slight angle. This process is self-limiting; if the gap gets too small, the pulses erode the carbon, so the gap width can be controlled to produce a fairly constant 5 nm slit between them.

Since the screen needs to be held in a vacuum to work, there is a large inward force on the glass surfaces due to the surrounding atmospheric pressure. Because the emitters are laid out in vertical columns, there is a space between each column where there is no phosphor, normally above the column power lines. SEDs use this space to place thin sheets or rods on top of the conductors, which keep the two glass surfaces apart. A series of these is used to reinforce the screen over its entire surface, which significantly reduces the needed strength of the glass itself. A CRT has no place for similar reinforcements, so the glass at the front screen must be thick enough to support all the pressure. SEDs are thus much thinner and lighter than CRTs.

SEDs can have a 100,000:1 contrast ratio.

== History ==
Canon began SED research in 1986. Their early research used PdO electrodes without the carbon films on top, but controlling the slit width proved difficult. At the time there were a number of flat-screen technologies in early development, and the only one close to commercialization was the plasma display panel (PDP), which had numerous disadvantages – manufacturing cost and energy use among them. LCDs were not suitable for larger screen sizes due to low yields and complex manufacturing.

In 2004 Canon signed an agreement with Toshiba to create a joint venture to continue development of SED technology, forming "SED Ltd." Toshiba introduced new technology to pattern the conductors underlying the emitters using technologies adapted from inkjet printers. At the time both companies claimed that production was slated to begin in 2005. Both Canon and Toshiba started displaying prototype units at trade shows during 2006, including 55" and 36" units from Canon, and a 42" unit from Toshiba. They were widely lauded in the press for their image quality, saying it was "something that must be seen to believe[d]."

However, by this point Canon's SED introduction date had already slipped several times. It was first claimed it would go into production in 1999. This was pushed back to 2005 after the joint agreement, and then again into 2007 after the first demonstrations at CES and other shows.

In October 2006, Toshiba's president announced the company plans to begin full production of 55-inch SED TVs in July 2007 at its recently built SED volume-production facility in Himeji.

In December 2006, Toshiba President and Chief Executive Atsutoshi Nishida said Toshiba was on track to mass-produce SED TV sets in cooperation with Canon by 2008. He said the company planned to start small-output production in the fall of 2007, but they do not expect SED displays to become a commodity and will not release the technology to the consumer market because of its expected high price, reserving it solely for professional broadcasting applications.

Also, in December 2006 it was revealed that one reason for the delay was a lawsuit brought against Canon by Applied Nanotech. On 25 May 2007, Canon announced that the prolonged litigation would postpone the launch of SED televisions, and a new launch date would be announced at some date in the future.

Applied Nanotech, a subsidiary of Nano-Proprietary, holds a number of patents related to FED and SED manufacturing. They had sold Canon a perpetual license for a coating technology used in their newer carbon-based emitter structure. Applied Nanotech claimed that Canon's agreement with Toshiba amounted to an illegal technology transfer, and a separate agreement would have to be reached. They first approached the problem in April 2005.

Canon responded to the lawsuit with several actions. On 12 January 2007 they announced that they would buy all of Toshiba's shares in SED Inc. in order to eliminate Toshiba's involvement in the venture. They also started re-working their existing RE40,062 patent filing in order to remove any of Applied Nanotech's technologies from their system. The modified patent was issued on 12 February 2008.

On 22 February 2007, the U.S. District Court for the Western District of Texas, a district widely known for agreeing with patent holders in intellectual property cases, ruled in a summary judgment that Canon had violated its agreement by forming a joint television venture with Toshiba. However, on 2 May 2007 a jury ruled that no additional damages beyond the $5.5m fee for the original licensing contract were due.

On 25 July 2008, the U.S. Court of Appeals for the 5th Circuit reversed the lower court's decision and provided that Canon's "irrevocable and perpetual" non-exclusive licence was still enforceable and covers Canon's restructured subsidiary SED. On 2 December 2008, Applied Nanotech dropped the lawsuit, stating that continuing the lawsuit "would probably be a futile effort".

In spite of legal success, Canon announced at the same time that the Great Recession was making introduction of the sets far from certain, going so far as to say it would not be launching the product at that time "because people would laugh at them".

Canon also had an ongoing OLED development process that started in the midst of the lawsuit. In 2007 they announced a joint deal to form "Hitachi Displays Ltd.", with Matsushita and Canon each taking a 24.9% share of Hitachi's existing subsidiary. Canon later announced that they were purchasing Tokki Corp, a maker of OLED fabrication equipment.

In April 2009 during NAB 2009, Peter Putman was quoted as saying "I was asked on more than one occasion about the chances of Canon's SED making a comeback, something I would not have bet money on after the Nano Technologies licensing debacle. However, a source within Canon told me at the show that the SED is still very much alive as a pro monitor technology. Indeed, a Canon SED engineer from Japan was quietly making the rounds in the Las Vegas Convention Center to scope out the competition."

Canon officially announced on 25 May 2010 the end of the development of SED TVs for the home consumer market, but indicated that they will continue development for commercial applications like medical equipment. On 18 August 2010, Canon decided to liquidate SED Inc., a consolidated subsidiary of Canon Inc. developing SED technology, citing difficulties to secure appropriate profitability and effectively ending hopes to one day see SED TVs in the home or the room or the living room.

== See also ==
- Comparison of display technology
- Field-emission display
- Organic light-emitting diode
- Quantum dot display

== Patents ==
- U.S. Patent RE40,062 Archived 2022-05-06 at the Wayback Machine, "Display device with electron-emitting device with electron-emitting region", Seishiro Yoshioka et al./Canon Kabushiki Kaisha, Filed 2 June 2000, Re-issued 12 Feb 2008

=== Further reading ===
- "Funding for organic-LED technology, patent disputes, and more" Archived 2009-06-01 at the Wayback Machine, Nature Photonics, Volume 1 Number 5 (2007), pg. 278
