= Field-emission display =

Flat panel display technology

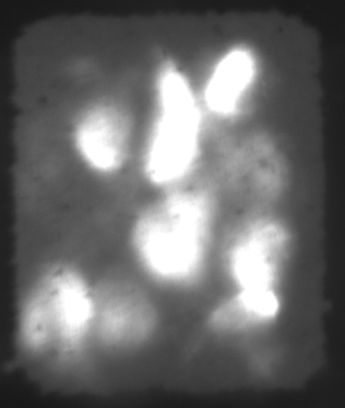
An FED sub pixel

A field-emission display (FED) is a flat panel display technology that uses large-area field electron emission sources to provide electrons that strike colored phosphor to produce a color image. In a general sense, an FED consists of a matrix of cathode-ray tubes, each tube producing a single sub-pixel, grouped in threes to form red-green-blue (RGB) pixels. FEDs combine the advantages of CRTs, namely their high contrast levels and very fast response times, with the packaging advantages of LCD and other flat-panel technologies. They also offer the possibility of requiring less power, about half that of an LCD system. FEDs can also be made transparent.

Sony was the major proponent of the FED design and put considerable research and development effort into the system during the 2000s, planning mass production in 2009. Sony's FED efforts started winding down in 2009, as LCD became the dominant flat-panel technology. In January 2010, AU Optronics announced that it acquired essential FED assets from Sony and intends to continue development of the technology. As of 2024, no large-scale commercial FED production has been undertaken.

FEDs are closely related to another developing display technology, the surface-conduction electron-emitter display (SED), differing primarily in details of the electron-emission system.

== Operation ==
FED display operates like a conventional cathode-ray tube (CRT) with an electron gun that uses high voltage (10 kV) to accelerate electrons, which in turn excite the phosphors, but instead of a single electron gun, an FED display contains a grid of individual nanoscopic electron guns. It consists of 2 sheets of glass spaced at regular intervals that face each other, one of which contains the emitters, spacers and the grid, and the other that contains the phosphors.

An FED screen is constructed by laying down a series of metal stripes onto a glass plate to form a series of cathode lines. Photolithography is used to lay down a series of rows of switching gates at right angles to the cathode lines, forming an addressable grid. At the intersection of each row and column a small patch of up to 4,500 emitters is deposited, typically using methods developed from inkjet printers. The metal grid is laid on top of the switching gates to complete the gun structure.

A high voltage-gradient field is created between the emitters and a metal mesh suspended above them, pulling electrons from the tips of the emitters. This is a highly non-linear process, and small changes in voltage will quickly cause the number of emitted electrons to saturate. The grid can be individually addressed, but only the emitters located at the crossing points of the powered cathode, gate lines will have enough power to produce a visible spot, and any power leaks to surrounding elements will not be visible. The non-linearity of the process allows avoidance of active matrix addressing schemes – once the pixel lights up, it will naturally glow. Non-linearity also means that the brightness of the sub-pixel is pulse-width modulated to control the number of electrons being produced, like in plasma displays.

The grid voltage sends the electrons flowing into the open area between the emitters at the back and the screen at the front of the display, where a second accelerating voltage additionally accelerates them towards the screen, giving them enough energy to light the phosphors. Since the electrons from any single emitter are fired toward a single sub-pixel, the scanning electromagnets are not needed.

CNT-FEDs use carbon nanotubes doped with nitrogen and/or boron as emitters. Samsung has previously worked on the development of this kind of display, however, Samsung has never released any products using this technology. CNT-FED places the carbon nanotube emitters at the bottom center of cavities called gate holes, which are made using electrically insulating material. A gold film is deposited on top of this material without blocking the gate holes in order to allow electrons from the carbon nanotubes to pass through. The gold film acts as a gate or grid, which accelerates the electrons. Gold is also used as the cathode, and the carbon nanotubes are built on top of it. The cathode is laid out using photolithography to create an addressable grid. Spacers are placed at regular intervals which keep both glass panels 300 microns apart. The space created by the spaces contains a vacuum. The anode may be made out of aluminum or Indium tin oxide (ITO), and it may be placed below or on top of the phosphors.

== Disadvantages ==
Just like any other displays with individually addressable sub-pixels, FED displays can potentially suffer from manufacturing problems that will result in dead pixels. However, the emitters are so small that many "guns" can power a sub-pixel, the screen can be examined for dead emitters and pixel brightness corrected by increasing the pulse width to make up for the loss through increased emissions from the other emitters feeding the same pixel.

1. The efficiency of the field emitters is based on the extremely small radii of the tips, but this small size renders the cathodes susceptible to damage by ion impact. The ions are produced by the high voltages interacting with residual gas molecules inside the device.
2. FED display requires a vacuum to operate, so the display tube has to be sealed and mechanically robust. However, since the distance between the emitters and phosphors is quite small, generally a few millimeters, the screen can be mechanically reinforced by placing spacer strips or posts between the front and back face of the tube.
3. FEDs require high vacuum levels, which are difficult to attain: the vacuum suitable for conventional CRTs and vacuum tubes is not sufficient for long-term FED operation. Intense electron bombardment of the phosphor layer will also release gas during use.

== Competing technologies ==
=== Cathode-ray tube ===
FEDs eliminate much of the electrical complexity of cathode-ray tubes, including the heated filaments in the electron gun used to generate electrons and the electromagnets in the deflection yokes used to steer the beam, and are thus much more power efficient than a CRT of similar size. However, FEDs are technically worse than CRTs, as they are not capable of multiscanning.

=== LCD ===
Flat-panel LCDs use a bright light source and filter out half of the light with a polarizer, and then filter most of the light to produce red, green and blue (RGB) sources for the sub-pixels. That means that, at best, only 1/6 (or less in practice) of the light being generated at the back of the panel reaches the screen. In most cases the liquid crystal matrix itself then filters out additional light in order to change the brightness of the sub-pixels and produce a color gamut. So in spite of using extremely efficient light sources like cold-cathode fluorescent lamps or high-power white LEDs, the overall efficiency of an LCD is not very high. Although the lighting process used in the FED is less efficient, only lit sub-pixels require power, which means that FEDs are more efficient than LCDs. Sony's 36" FED prototypes have been shown drawing only 14 W when displaying brightly lit scenes, whereas a conventional LCD screen of similar size would normally draw well over 100 W.

Avoiding the need for a backlighting system and thin-film transistor active matrix also greatly reduces the complexity of the set as a whole, while also reducing its front-to-back thickness. While an FED has two sheets of glass instead of the one in an LCD, the overall weight is likely to be less than of a similarly sized LCD. FEDs are also claimed to be cheaper to manufacture, as they have fewer total components and processes involved. However, they are not easy devices to manufacture as a reliable commercial device, and considerable production difficulties have been encountered. This led to a race with two other front-running technologies aiming to replace LCDs in television use, the active-matrix OLED and surface-conduction electron-emitter display (SED).

=== OLED ===
Organic light-emitting diodes (OLED) cells directly emit light. Therefore, OLEDs require no separate light source and are highly efficient in terms of light output. They offer the same high contrast levels and fast response times that FED offers. OLEDs are a serious competitor to FEDs, but suffer from the same sorts of problems bringing them to mass production.

=== SED ===
SEDs are very similar to FEDs, the primary difference between the two technologies is that SED uses a single emitter for each column instead of the individual spots of the FED. Whereas an FED uses electrons emitted directly toward the front of the screen, the SED uses electrons that are emitted from the vicinity of a small "gap" in a surface-conducting track laid down parallel to the plane of the panel, and extracted sideways to their original direction of motion. SED uses an emitter array based on palladium oxide laid down by an inkjet or silk-screen process. SED has been considered to be the variant of FED that is feasible to mass-produce, however, as of late 2009 no commercial SED display products have been made available by the industry.

== History ==
The first concentrated effort to develop FED systems started in 1991 by Silicon Video Corporation, later Candescent Technologies. Their "ThinCRT" displays used metal emitters, originally built out of tiny molybdenum cones known as Spindt tips. They suffered from erosion due to the high accelerating voltages. Attempts to lower accelerating voltages and find suitable phosphors that would work at lower power levels, as well as address the erosion problem through better materials, were unsuccessful.

Candescent pushed ahead with development in spite of problems, breaking ground on a new production facility in Silicon Valley in 1998, partnering with Sony. However the technology was not ready, and the company suspended equipment purchases in early 1999, citing "contamination issues". The plant was never completed, and after spending $600 million on development they filed for Chapter 11 protection in June 2004, and sold all of their assets to Canon that August.

Another attempt to address the erosion issues was made by Advance Nanotech, a subsidiary of SI Diamond Technology of Austin, Texas. Advance Nanotech developed a doped diamond dust, whose sharp corners appeared to be an ideal emitter. However, the development never panned out, and was abandoned in 2003. Advance Nanotech then applied their efforts to the similar SED display, licensing their technology to Canon. When Canon brought in Toshiba to help developing the display, Advance Nanotech sued, but ultimately lost in their efforts to re-negotiate the contracts based on their claim that Canon transferred the technology to Toshiba.

Post-2000 FED research focused on carbon nanotubes (CNTs) as emitters. Nano-emissive display (NED) was Motorola's term for their carbon-nanotube-based FED technology. A prototype model was demonstrated in May 2005, but Motorola has now halted all FED-related development.

Futaba Corporation had been running a Spindt-type development program since 1990. They produced prototypes of smaller FED systems for a number of years and demonstrated them at various trade shows, but like the Candescent efforts, no large-screen production had been forthcoming. Later development continued on a nanotube based version.

Sony, having abandoned their efforts with Candescent, licensed CNT technology from Carbon Nanotechnologies Inc., of Houston, Texas, who were the public licensing agent for a number of technologies developed at Rice University's Carbon Nanotechnology Laboratory. In 2007 they demonstrated an FED display at a trade show in Japan and claimed they would be introducing production models in 2009. They later spun off their FED efforts to Field Emission Technologies Inc., which continued to aim for a 2009 release.

Their plans to start production at a former Pioneer factory in Kagoshima were delayed by financial issues in late 2008. On March 26, 2009 Field Emission Technologies Inc. (FET) announced that it was closing down due to the inability to raise capital.

In January 2010, Taiwanese AU Optronics Corporation (AUO) announced that it had acquired assets from Sony's FET and FET Japan, including "patents, know-how, inventions, and relevant equipment related to FED technology and materials". In November 2010, Nikkei reported that AUO planned to start mass production of FED panels in the fourth quarter of 2011, however AUO commented that the technology was still in the research stage and there were no plans to begin mass production.

== See also ==
- Comparison of display technology
- Field emitter array
- Field electron emission
- Surface-conduction electron-emitter display (SED)
