= Qualcomm Toq =

Smartwatch by Qualcomm

Qualcomm Toq Smartwatch
- Manufacturer: Qualcomm
- Type: Smartwatch
- Released: December 2, 2013
- Introductory price: USD 349.99
- Operating system: Qualcomm OS; Can communicate with Android apps using Bluetooth
- Display: 1.55 inch Mirasol; 288×192 px
- Camera: No camera
- Connectivity: Bluetooth 2.1 + EDR; Bluetooth 3.0
- Related: Smart Watches
- Website: Defunct

The Toq (pronounced “tok” as in "tick-tock") was a smartwatch developed by Qualcomm which was released in limited quantities as a proof of concept to OEMs in December 2013. The Toq was first unveiled at Qualcomm's annual Uplinq event on September 4, 2013 in San Diego. It synced with Android 4.0+ smartphones, allowing users to scan through texts, emails, phone calls, and other notifications. It featured a Mirasol display, which like E Ink e-reader screens, could be easily viewed in direct sunlight. Unlike most ereaders, it could display colors and refresh fast enough for watching videos, it also included speech recognition technology from Nuance to allow users to dictate replies to text messages. The Toq had a backlight for when there is no outside light source.

== Specifications ==
- 200 MHz Cortex-M3 microcontroller
- 1.55" Mirasol display
- Battery is inside the watchband and lasts for up to 5 days
- Charges wirelessly via a Qualcomm WiPower box

== See also ==
- Smartwatch
- Wearable computer
