= ISO 13406-2 =

Standard, "Ergonomic requirements for flat panel displays"

ISO 13406-2 is an ISO standard, with the full title "Ergonomic requirements for work with visual displays based on flat panels -- Part 2: Ergonomic requirements for flat panel displays". It is best known to end consumers for defining a series of flat-panel display "classes" with different numbers of permitted defects (or "dead pixels"). ISO 13406-2 also provides a classification of Viewing Direction Range Classes and Reflection Classes.

As part of an ISO standard, the classes are guidelines, and not mandatory. Where implemented, the interpretation of the standard by the panel or end product manufacturer and effects in terms of labeling of products, what class of panel is used, etc., can vary. Most flat-panel makers use this standard as the excuse for not accepting returns of defective flat-panels. Many customers argue that it is not honest in the makers' part to sell a product that most people would not accept if they knew it had these defects. Also, there is little offer of Class I panels, that added to the fact that the price of these models is usually very high, make it difficult to buy a totally guaranteed product. One solution to this problem would be to sell these defected panels at a lower price than normal ones, clearly indicating the presence of such defects.

The ISO 13406-2:2001 standard has been withdrawn and revised by the ISO 9241-302, 303, 305 and 307:2008 standards.

== Pixel Fault Classes ==
The standard lists four classes of devices, where a device of a specified class may contain a certain maximum number of defective pixels. Three distinct types of defective pixels are described:

- Type 1 = a hot pixel (always on, being colour white)
- Type 2 = a dead pixel (always off, meaning black)
- Type 3 = a stuck pixel (one or more sub-pixels (red, blue or green) are always on or always off)

The table below shows the maximum number of allowed defects (per type) per 1 million pixels.

Definition of Pixel Fault Classes – Maximum number of faults per million pixels
Class	Type 1	Type 2	Type 3	Cluster with more than one type 1 or type 2 faults	Cluster of type 3 faults
I	0	0	0	0	0
II	2	2	5	0	2
III	5	15	50	0	5
IV	50	150	500	5	50

As of 2007, most manufacturers specify their products as Pixel Fault Class II.
