= Comparison of display technology =

This is a comparison of various properties of different display technologies.

== General characteristics ==
| Display technology | Screen shape | Largest known diagonal | | Typical use | Usable in bright room |
| Display technology | Screen shape | (in) | (cm) | Typical use | Usable in bright room |
|---|---|---|---|---|---|
| Eidophor front projection | Flat | (limited only by brightness) | | TV | No |
| Shadow mask CRT | Spherical curve or flat | 42 | 107 | TV, computer monitor | Yes |
| Aperture grille CRT | Cylindrical curve or flat | 43 | 109 | TV, computer monitor | Yes |
| Monochrome CRT | Spherical curve or flat | 30 | 76 | TV, computer monitor, radar display, oscilloscope | Yes |
| Direct view Charactron CRT | Spherical curve | 24 | 61 | Computer monitor, radar display | No |
| CRT self-contained rear-projection | Flat lenticular | 80 | 203 | TV | Yes |
| CRT front projection | Flat | (limited only by brightness) | | TV or presentation | No |
| Plasma display | Flat | 152 | 386 | TV, computer monitor (In some early "portable" computers. They required too much power for battery-powered laptops) | Partial |
| LCD | Flat | 115 | 292 | TV, computer monitor | Yes |
| LCD self-contained rear-projection | Flat lenticular | 70 | 178 | TV | Yes |
| LCD front-projection | Flat | (limited only by brightness) | | TV or presentation | Yes |
| DLP self-contained rear-projection | Flat lenticular | 120 | 305 | TV | Yes |
| DLP front-projection | Flat | (limited only by brightness) | | TV or presentation | Yes |
| LCoS self-contained rear-projection | Flat | 110 | 279 | TV | Yes |
| LCoS front-projection | Flat | (limited only by brightness) | | TV or presentation | Yes |
| Laser self-contained rear projection | Flat lenticular | 75 | 191 | TV | Yes |
| LED | Flat | 279.92 | 711 | Billboards, TV | Yes |
| SED | Flat | 55 | 140 | Computer monitor, TV | Yes |
| FED | Flat | ? | ? | Computer monitor, TV | Yes |
| EPD (e-paper) | Flat (flexible) | ? | ? | Electronic paper | Yes |
| OLED | Any, but most commonly flat rectangular with or without rounded edges, notch(es) and holes, circular, or curved (flexible) | 88 | 223.52 | Computer monitor, TV, Mobile phone | Yes |
| Telescopic pixel display | | | | | |
| Ferroelectric LCD | | | | | |
| 'mLED' LED | Curved or flat | ?? | ?? | Mobile phones, wearable electronics, VR displays, smartwatches, optical instruments, AR displays | Yes |
| QDLED | — | — | — | — | Yes |
| IMOD | Flat | 1.2 | 3 | Mobile phone | Yes |
| Laser Phosphor Display (LPD) | Flat / Box | 196 | 497.8 | Presentation | Yes |
| Virtual retinal display | Any shape | — | — | Experimental, possibly virtual reality | Depends on system |

Major technologies are CRT, LCD and its derivatives (Quantum dot display, LED backlit LCD, WLCD, OLCD), Plasma, and OLED and its derivatives (Transparent OLED, PMOLED, AMOLED). An emerging technology is Micro LED. Cancelled and now obsolete technologies are SED and FED.

== Temporal characteristics ==
Different display technologies have vastly different temporal characteristics, leading to perceptual differences of motion, flicker, etc.

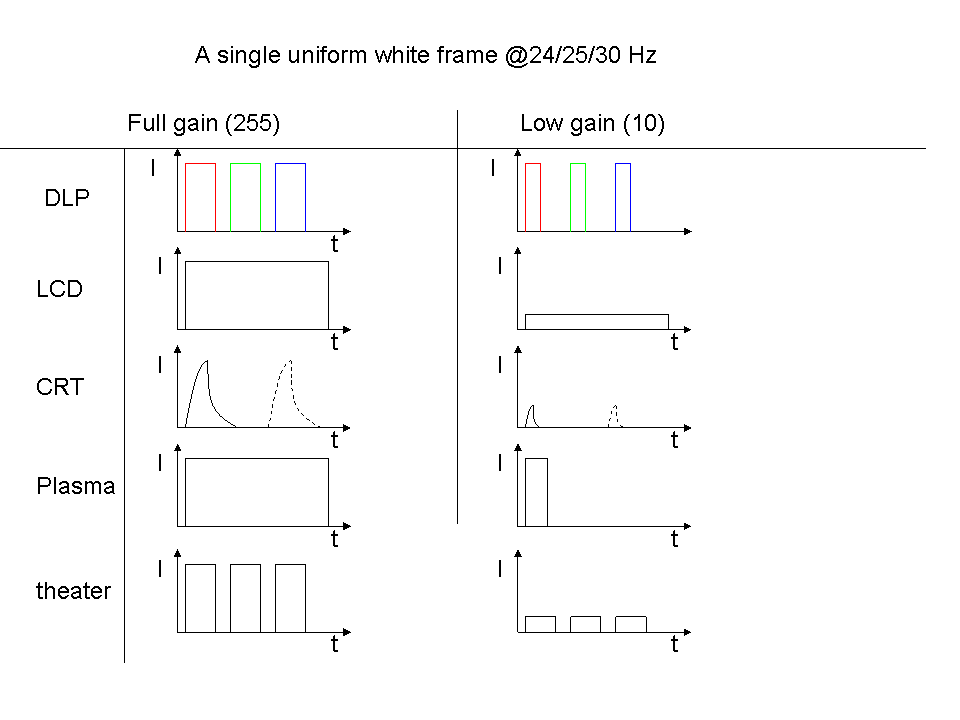
Sketch of some common display technologies' temporal behaviour

The figure shows a sketch of how different technologies present a single white/grey frame. Time and intensity is not to scale. Notice that some have a fixed intensity, while the illuminated period is variable. This is a kind of pulse-width modulation. Others can vary the actual intensity in response to the input signal.

- Single-chip DLPs use a kind of "chromatic multiplexing" in which each color is presented serially. The intensity is varied by modulating the "on" time of each pixel within the time-span of one color. Multi-chip DLPs are not represented in this sketch, but would have a curve identical to the plasma display.
- LCDs have a constant (backlit) image, where the intensity is varied by blocking the light shining through the panel.
- CRTs use an electron beam, scanning the display, flashing a lit image. If interlacing is used, a single full-resolution image results in two "flashes". The physical properties of the phosphor are responsible for the rise and decay curves.
- Plasma displays modulate the "on" time of each sub-pixel, similar to DLP.
- Movie theaters use a mechanical shutter to illuminate the same frame 2 or 3 times, increasing the flicker frequency to make it less perceptible to the human eye.

== Research ==
Researchers announced a display that uses silicon metasurface pixels that do not require polarized light and require half the energy. It employs a transparent conductive oxide as a heater that can quickly change the pixels. The pixels are 100 times thinner than liquid crystal. Response times are under 1 millisecond. They claim that the metasurface array could replace the liquid crystal layer in today's displays, eliminating the need for production technology.

== See also ==
- Computer monitor
- Large-screen television technology
