= Interferometric modulator display =

Qualcomm display technology

Interferometric modulator display (IMOD, trademarked mirasol) is a technology used in electronic visual displays that can create various colors via interference of reflected light. The color is selected with an electrically switched light modulator comprising a microscopic cavity that is switched on and off using driver integrated circuits similar to those used to address liquid crystal displays (LCD). An IMOD-based reflective flat panel display includes hundreds of thousands of individual IMOD elements each a microelectromechanical systems (MEMS)-based device.

In one state, an IMOD subpixel absorbs incident light and appears black to the viewer. In a second state, it reflects light at a specific wavelength, using a diffraction grating effect. When not being addressed, an IMOD display consumes very little power. Unlike conventional back-lit liquid crystal displays, it is clearly visible in bright ambient light such as sunlight. IMOD prototypes as of mid-2010 could emit 15 frames per second (fps), and in November 2011 Qualcomm demonstrated another prototype reaching 30 fps, suitable for video playback. The smartwatch Qualcomm Toq features this display with 40 fps.

Mirasol screens were only able to produce 60 Hz video but it quickly drained the battery. Devices that used the screen have colors that look washed out, so the technology never saw mainstream support.

== Working principle ==
The basic elements of an IMOD-based display are microscopic devices that act essentially as mirrors that can be switched on or off individually. Each of these elements reflects only one exact wavelength of light, such as a specific hue of red, green or blue, when turned on, and absorbs light (appears black) when off. Elements are organised into a rectangular array in order to produce a display screen.

An array of elements that all reflect the same color when turned on produces a monochromatic display, for example black and red (in this example using IMOD elements that reflect red light when "on"). As each element reflects only a certain amount of light, grouping several elements of the same color together as subpixels allows different brightness levels for a pixel based on how many elements are reflective at a particular time.

Multiple color displays are created by using subpixels, each designed to reflect a specific different color. Multiple elements of each color are generally used to both give more combinations of displayable color (by mixing the reflected colors) and to balance the overall brightness of the pixel.

Because elements only use power in order to switch between on and off states (no power is needed to reflect or absorb light hitting the display once the element is either reflecting or absorbing), IMOD-based displays potentially use much less power than displays that generate light and/or need constant power to keep pixels in a particular state. Being a reflective display, they require an external light source (such as daylight or a lamp) to be readable, just like paper or other electronic paper technologies.

=== Details ===
A pixel in an IMOD-based display consists of one or more subpixels that are individual microscopic interferometric cavities similar in operation to Fabry–Pérot interferometers (etalons). While a simple etalon consists of two half-silvered mirrors, an IMOD comprises a reflective membrane which can move in relation to a semi-transparent thin film stack. With an air gap defined within this cavity, the IMOD behaves like an optically resonant structure whose reflected color is determined by the size of the airgap. Application of a voltage to the IMOD creates electrostatic forces which bring the membrane into contact with the thin film stack. When this happens the behavior of the IMOD changes to that of an induced absorber. The consequence is that almost all incident light is absorbed and no colors are reflected. It is this binary operation that is the basis for the IMOD's application in reflective flat panel displays. Since the display utilizes light from ambient sources, the display's brightness increases in high ambient environments (i.e. sunlight). In contrast, a back-lit LCD suffers from incident light.

For a practical RGB color model (RGB) display, a single RGB pixel is built from several subpixels, because the brightness of a monochromatic pixel is not adjusted. A monochromatic array of subpixels represents different brightness levels for each color, and for each pixel, there are three such arrays: red, green and blue.

== Development ==
The IMOD technology was invented by Mark W. Miles, a MEMS researcher and founder of Etalon, Inc., and (co-founder) of Iridigm Display Corporation. Qualcomm took over the development of this technology after its acquisition of Iridigm in 2004, and subsequently formed Qualcomm MEMS Technologies (QMT). Qualcomm has allowed commercialization of the technology under the trademark name "mirasol". This energy-efficient, biomimetic technology sees application and use in portable electronics such as e-book readers and mobile phones.

Future IMOD panels manufacturers include Qualcomm in conjunction with Foxlink, having established a joint-venture with Sollink (高強光電) in 2009 with a future facility dedicated to manufacturing IMOD panels. Production for this began in Jan 2011, with the fabricated panels intended for devices such as e-readers.

As of 2015, the IMOD Mirasol display laboratory in Longtan, Taiwan, formerly run by Qualcomm, is now apparently run by Apple.

== Uses ==
IMOD displays are now available in the commercial marketplace. QMT's displays, using IMOD technology, are found in the Acoustic Research ARWH1 Stereo Bluetooth headset device, the Showcare Monitoring system (Korea), the Hisense C108, and MP3 applications from Freestyle Audio and Skullcandy. In the mobile phone marketplace, Taiwanese manufacturers Inventec and Cal-Comp have announced phones with mirasol displays, and LG claims to be developing "one or more" handsets using mirasol technology. These products all have only two-color (black plus one other) "bi-chromic" displays. A multi-color IMOD display is used in the Qualcomm Toq smartwatch.
