= Defective pixel =

Nonfunctional pixel on a digital image

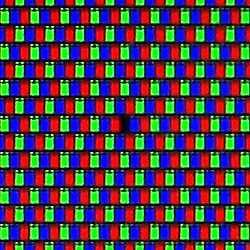
Close-up of an LCD, showing a dead green subpixel as a black rectangle

A defective pixel or a dead pixel is a pixel on a liquid crystal display (LCD) that is not functioning properly. The ISO standard ISO 13406-2 distinguishes between three different types of defective pixels, while hardware companies tend to have further distinguishing types.

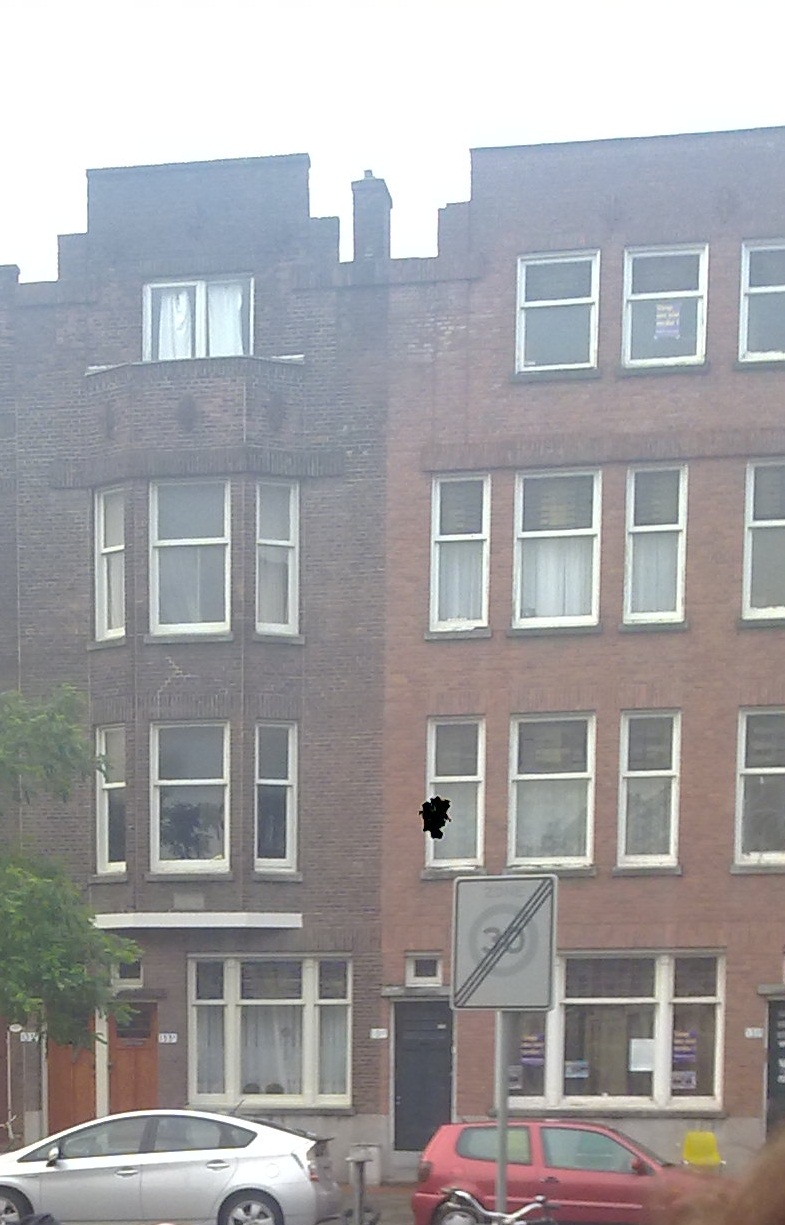
A photograph taken with a damaged image sensor

Similar defects can also occur in charge-coupled device (CCD) and CMOS image sensors in digital cameras. In these devices, defective pixels fail to sense light levels correctly, whereas defective pixels in LCDs fail to reproduce light levels correctly.

== Types ==
=== Dark dot defect ===
A dark dot defect is usually caused by a transistor in the transparent electrode layer that is stuck "on" for TN panels or "off" for MVA, PVA, and IPS panels. In that state, the liquid crystal material does not do any rotation so that the light from the backlight does not pass through the RGB layer of the display.

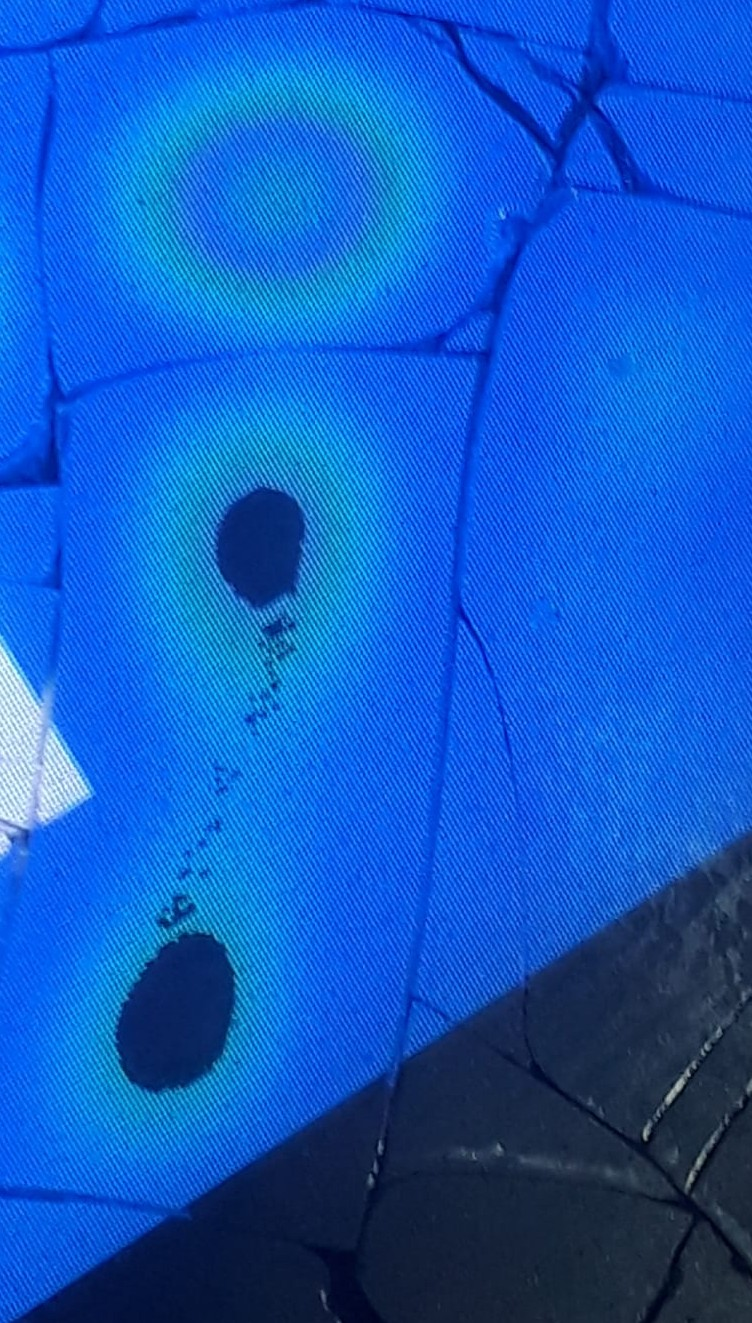
Dark dot defect in a phone screen

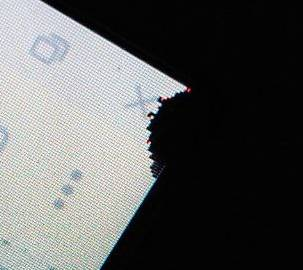
Defective pixels on LCD

=== Bright dot defect ===
A bright dot defect or hot pixel is a group of three sub-pixels (one pixel) all of whose transistors are "off" for TN panels or stuck "on" for MVA and PVA panels. This allows all light to pass through to the RGB layer, creating a bright pixel that is always on.

Another cause of bright dot may be the presence of impurities in the liquid crystal. On the one hand, impurities will affect the alignment of liquid crystal molecules, and on the other hand, they can reflect light to form bright spots.

=== Partial sub-pixel defect ===
A partial sub-pixel defect is a manufacturing defect in which the RGB film layer was not cut properly.

=== Tape automated bonding fault ===
A tape automated bonding fault (TAB fault) is caused by a connection failure from the TAB that connects the transparent electrode layers to the video driver board of an LCD.

TAB is one of several methods employed in the LCD-manufacturing process to electrically connect hundreds of signal paths going to the rows and columns of electrodes in layer 6 (the transparent electrode layer) in the LCD to the video integrated circuits (ICs) on the driver board that drives these electrodes.

If an LCD is subjected to physical shock, this could cause one or more TAB connections to fail inside the display. This failure is often caused by horizontally flexing the chassis (e.g., while wall-mounting or transporting a display face up/down) or simple failure of the adhesive holding the TAB against the glass. TAB faults require the replacement of the LCD module itself. If these connections were to fail, the effect would be that an entire row or column of pixels would fail to activate. This causes a horizontal or vertical black line to appear on the display while the rest of the display would appear normal. The horizontal failure runs from edge to edge; the vertical failure runs from top-to-bottom.

Apple claims that TAB faults, as opposed to other physical defects found in an LCD, do not allow for repair.

=== Stuck sub-pixel ===
A stuck sub-pixel or stuck pixel is a pixel that is always "on". This is usually caused by a transistor that is getting power all the time (VA/IPS) or not getting any power (TN) and is therefore continuously allowing light at that point to pass through to the RGB layer. Any given pixel will stay red, blue, or green and will not change when attempting to display an image. These pixels may only show up using certain applications, or they may be on all the time.

Stuck pixels can often be fixed using software "pixel refreshing" tools (websites), which rapidly flash colours on and off on the screen at the pixel level. On a macroscopic level, these look like RGB visual static. The rapid changes can serve to dislodge stubborn, stuck liquid crystal.

A slo-mo (4X) of an iPhone 11 display under 100X magnification. The iPhone is playing a pixel refresher from jscreenfix.com. The two lines in the centre are dead pixels. This was determined after the fact that pixel refreshers had no effect on the screen's defect.

== Manufacturer policy ==
In LCD manufacture, it is common for a display to be manufactured with several sub-pixel defects (each pixel is composed of three primary-colored sub-pixels). The number of faulty pixels tolerated before a screen is rejected, is dependent on the class that the manufacturer has given the display (although officially described by the ISO 13406-2 standard, not all manufacturers interpret this standard the same way, or follow it at all).

Some manufacturers have a zero-tolerance policy with regard to LCD, rejecting all units found to have any number of (sub-)pixel defects. Displays meeting this standard are deemed Class I. Other manufacturers reject displays according to the number of total defects, the number of defects in a given group (e.g., one dead pixel or three stuck sub-pixels in a five-by-five pixel area), or other criteria.

In some cases, a manufacturer sends all screens to sale then replaces the screen if the customer reports the unit as faulty and the defective pixels meet their minimum requirements for return. Some screens come with a leaflet stating how many dead pixels they are allowed to have before the owner can send them back to the manufacturer. Dead pixels may tend to occur in clusters; in most cases, displays with such a cluster problem can be sent back to the manufacturer.

== In other devices ==
=== Flip-disc displays ===
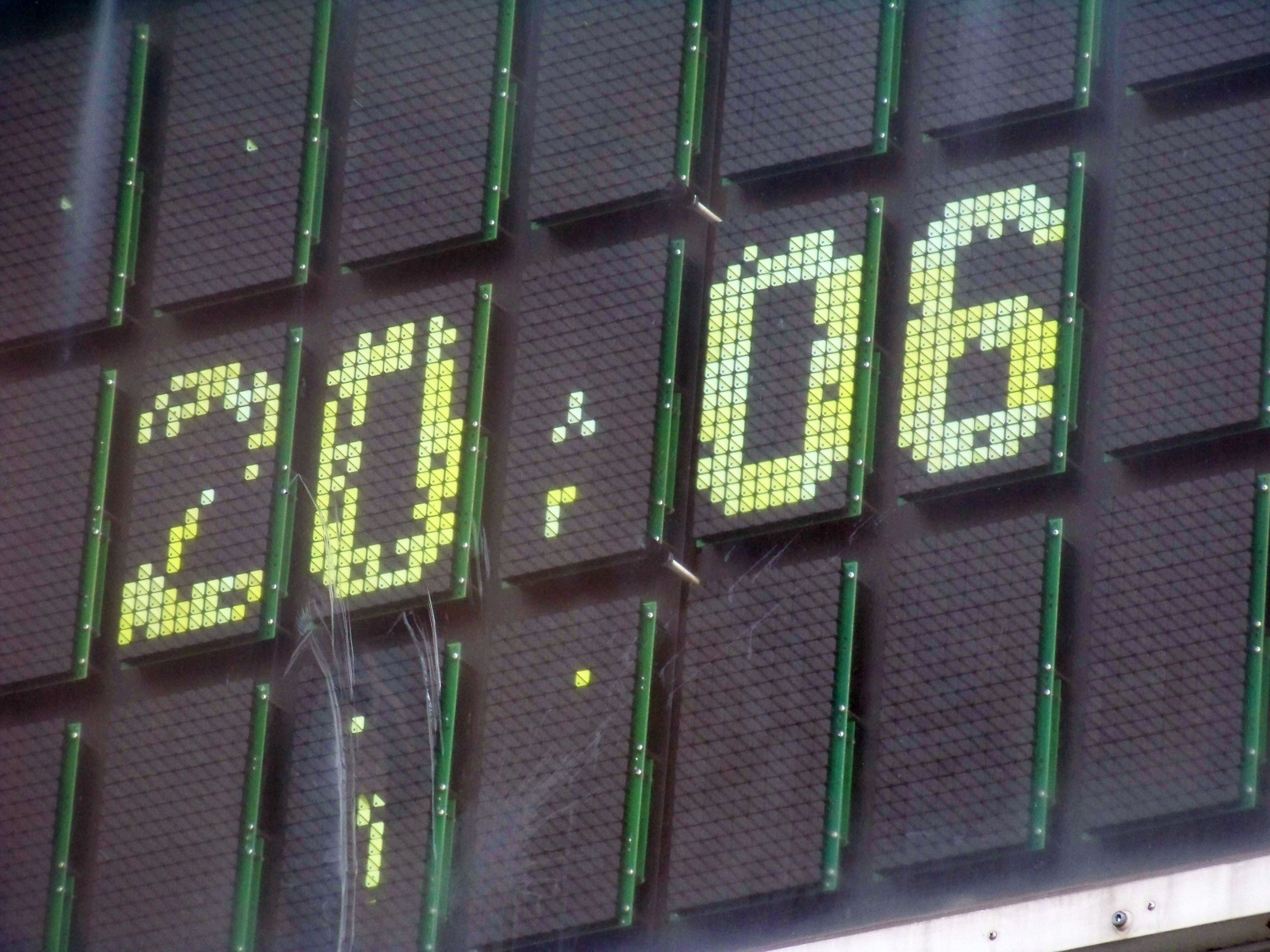
A flip-disc variable-message sign with clock, showing several stuck pixels

=== Digital cameras ===
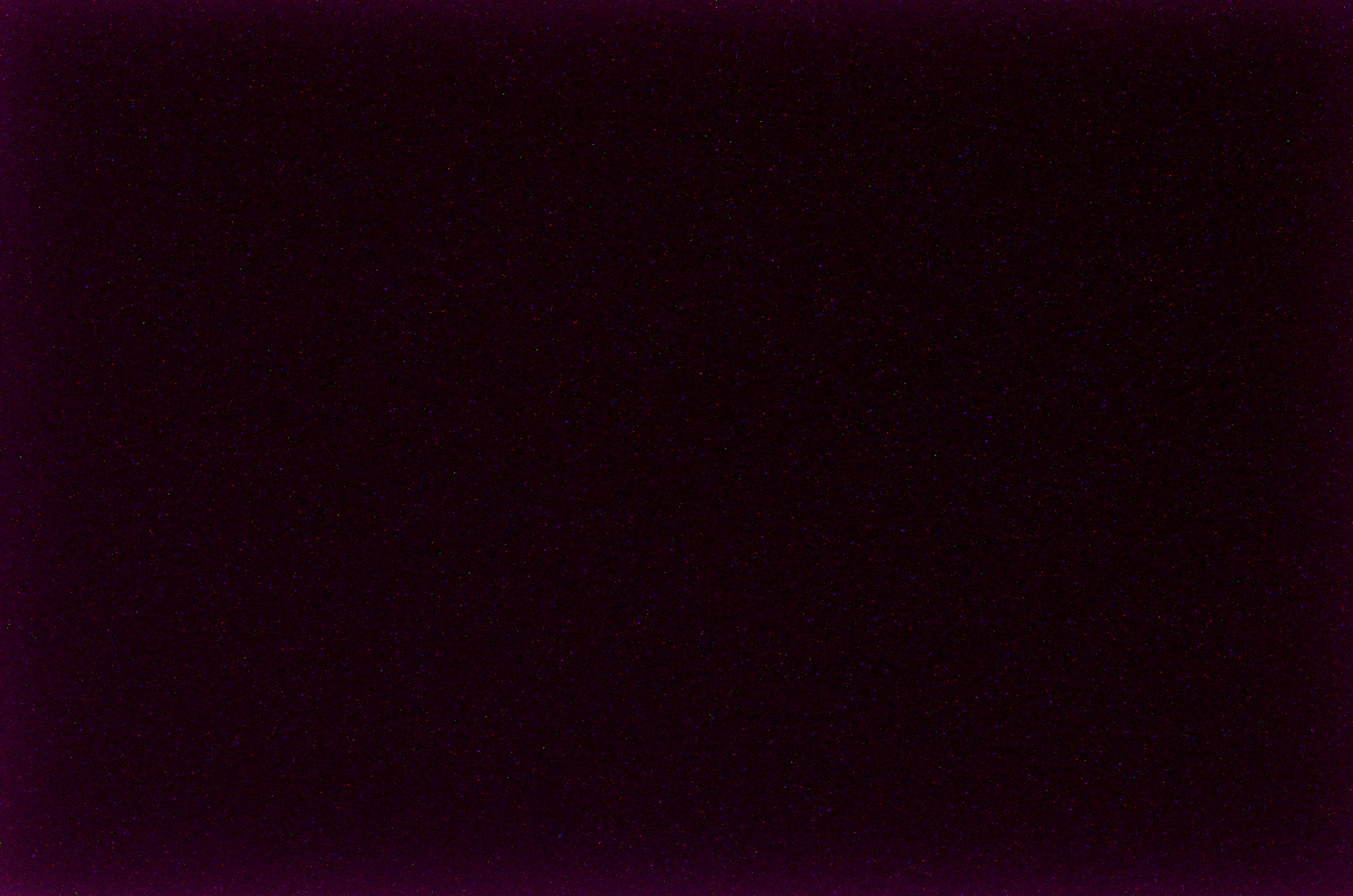
Hundreds of hot pixels appear in a 32-minute long exposure photograph taken in virtual darkness. Note: Must be viewed at full size.

== See also ==
- ISO 13406-2, the ISO standard that defines classes of devices based on a certain maximum number of defective pixels
