= Monitor filter =

Computer display accessory

A monitor filter is an accessory to the computer display to filter out the light reflected from the smooth glass surface of a CRT or flat panel display. Many also include a ground to dissipate static buildup. A secondary use for monitor filters is privacy as they decrease the viewing angle of a monitor, preventing it from being viewed from the side; in this case, they are also called privacy screens.

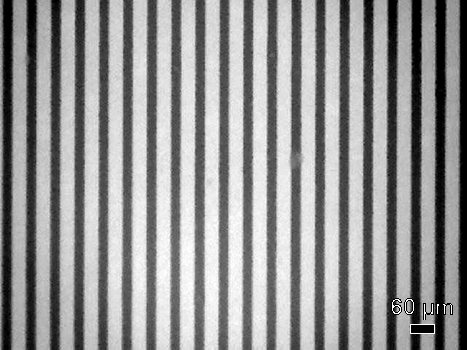
privacy screen (microscope photo)

The operating principle of a slat protection film (drawing)

The standard type of anti-glare filter consists of a coating that reduces the reflection from a glass or plastic surface. These are manufactured from polycarbonate or acrylic plastic. An older variety of anti-glare filter used a mesh filter that had the appearance of a nylon screen. Although effective, a mesh filter also caused degradation of the image quality.

Marketing names of privacy filters:

- HP's "SureView"
- Lenovo's "PrivacyGuard"
- Dell's "SafeScreen"

Support for privacy screen is available since Linux kernel 5.17 that expose it through Direct Rendering Manager and is used by GNOME 42.

Support for hotkey handling for toggling the privacy screen was added in Linux kernel 6.18.
