= Viewing cone =

Concept of computer visual displays

The viewing cone is the set of effective viewing directions of a visual display, as seen from the eye. This directional extent resembles a generalized cone. The concept has been introduced as an international standard ISO 13406-2, which defines it as the range of viewing directions that can safely be used for the intended task without "reduced visual performance". This standard describes a complex procedure which evaluates the viewing cone from measurements of luminance and chromaticity versus direction of observation. ISO 13406-2 introduces 4 viewing direction range classes, from a wide viewing cone, for many simultaneous observers, to the so-called "privacy display", with a severely limited viewing cone. Compliance routes for different display applications can now be found in the successor standard ISO 9241-300.

== Viewing direction ==
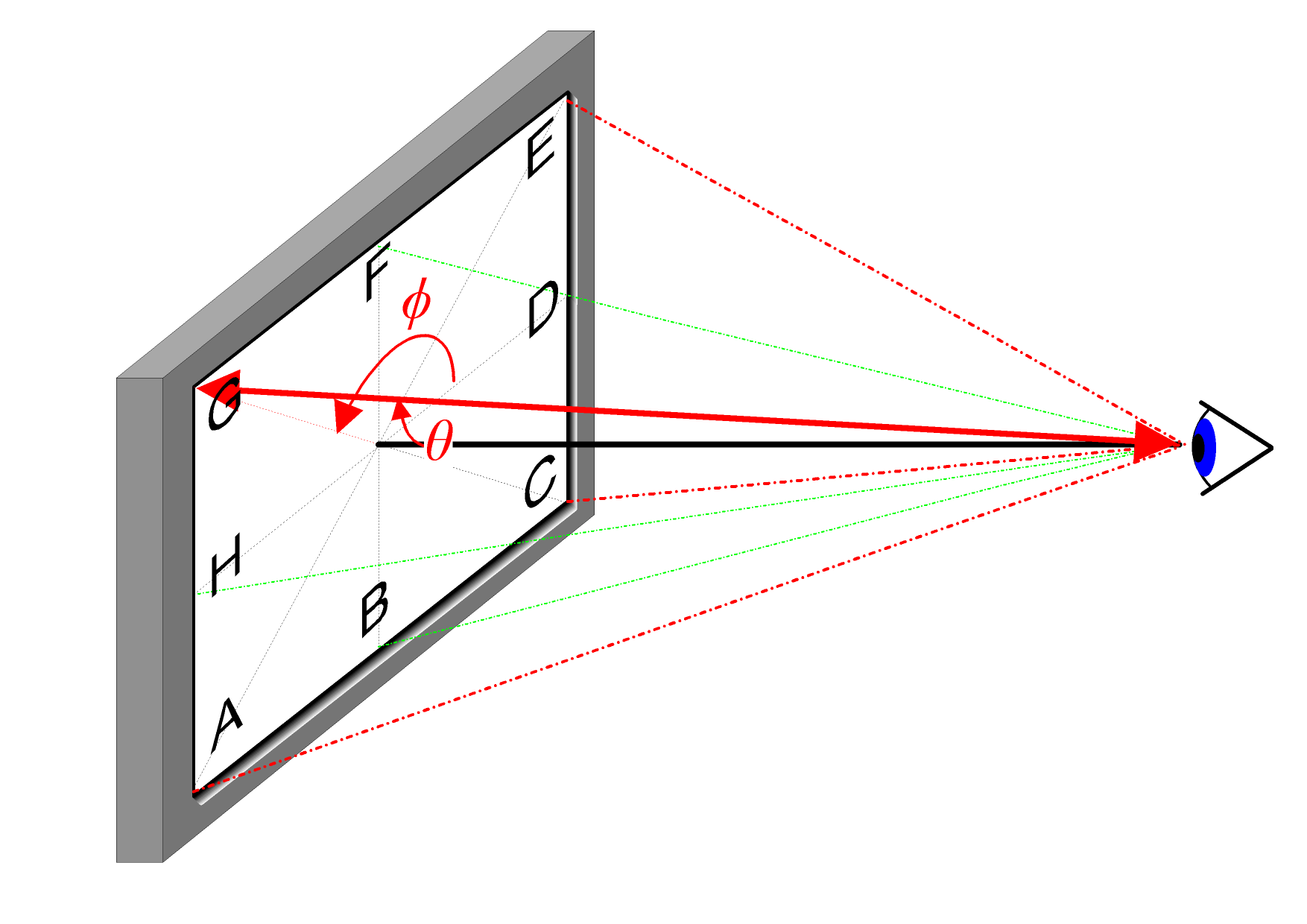
Figure 1: Illustration of the variation of the direction of observation (i.e. viewing direction) across the area of the display. All locations on the surface area of the screen are seen from a different direction.

When a visual display with non-vanishing size is seen by an observer, every point of the display area is seen from a different direction as illustrated in fig. 1. No two spots on the display are seen from the same direction. The larger the display is and the closer the observer is to the display the more the viewing direction varies over the surface area of the display.

Colloquially, the viewing direction is often called "viewing angle". This is an ill-chosen expression which should be avoided, because the viewing direction is specified by two polar angles: the angle of inclination, θ (measured from the surface normal of the display) and the azimuth angle, Φ, measured in the plane of the display as shown in figure 3.

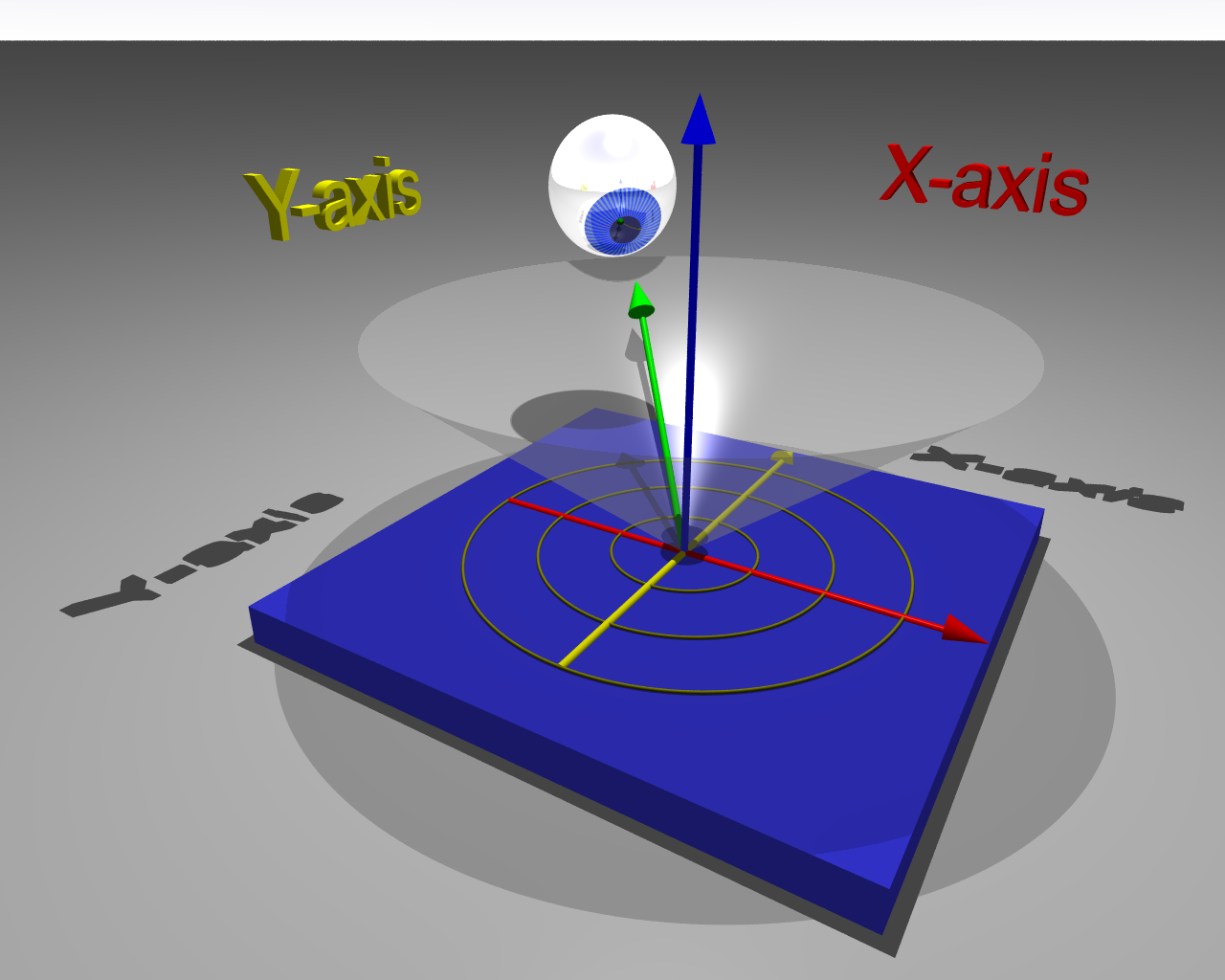
Figure 2: Illustration of an example of a viewing cone centered about the surface-normal of the display. The viewing cone may be tilted and rotated and may be of a less regular shape.

In fig. 2, the eyeball represents the observer that is looking at a specific spot on the display which is identical to the origin of the polar coordinate system. The green arrow is the viewing direction (i.e. direction of observation). The viewing direction is specified by the angle of inclination, θ, measured from the surface normal of the display (blue vertical arrow) while the azimuth angle, Φ, is the angle that the projection of the viewing direction onto the surface of the display makes with the x-axis (red arrow). The projection of the viewing direction is shown here as the shadow of the green arrow. The azimuth angle Φ increases counterclockwise as illustrated in figure 3.

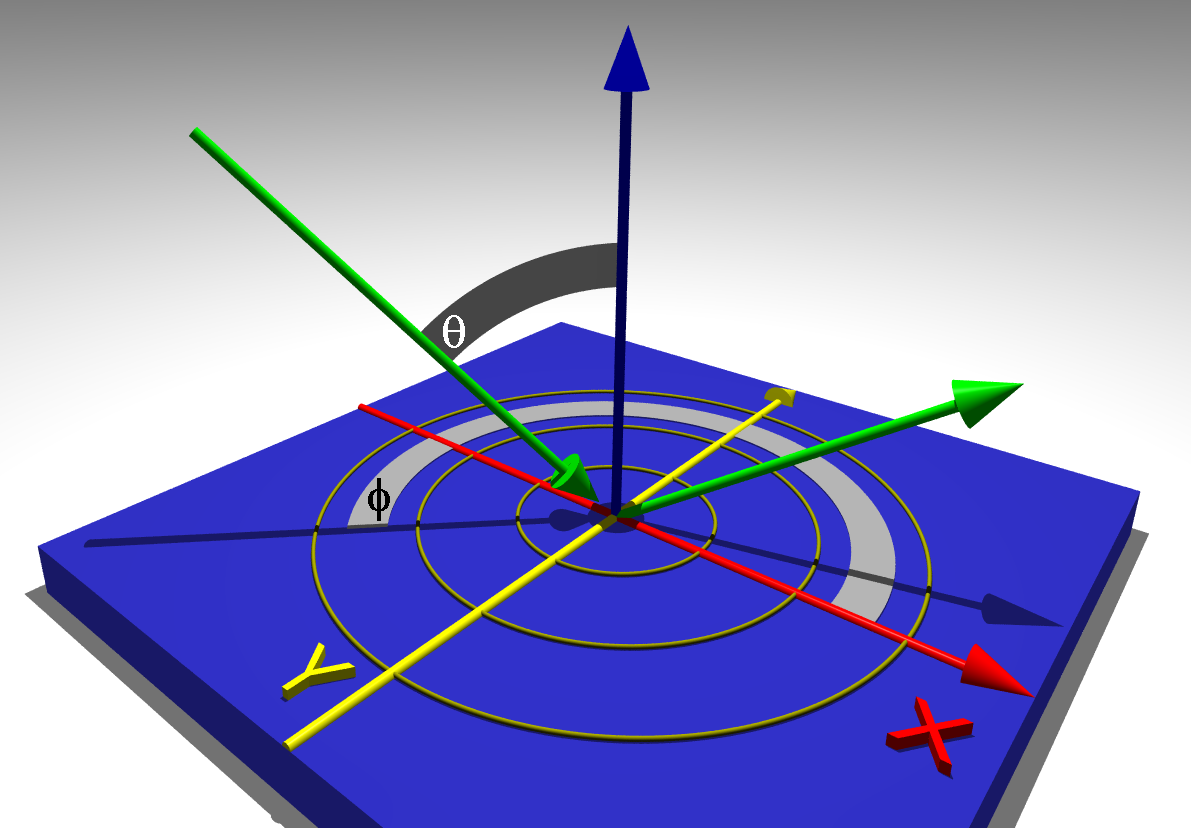
Figure 3: Illustration of the specification of the viewing direction by two polar angles: the angle of inclination (measured from the surface normal of the display) and the azimuth angle, measured in the plane of the display

The multitude of directions, from which a display can be seen without artifacts and distortions that would render its intended use impossible (e.g. computerized office work, television, entertainment) is called the viewing cone (even though its shape might be that of a generalized cone).

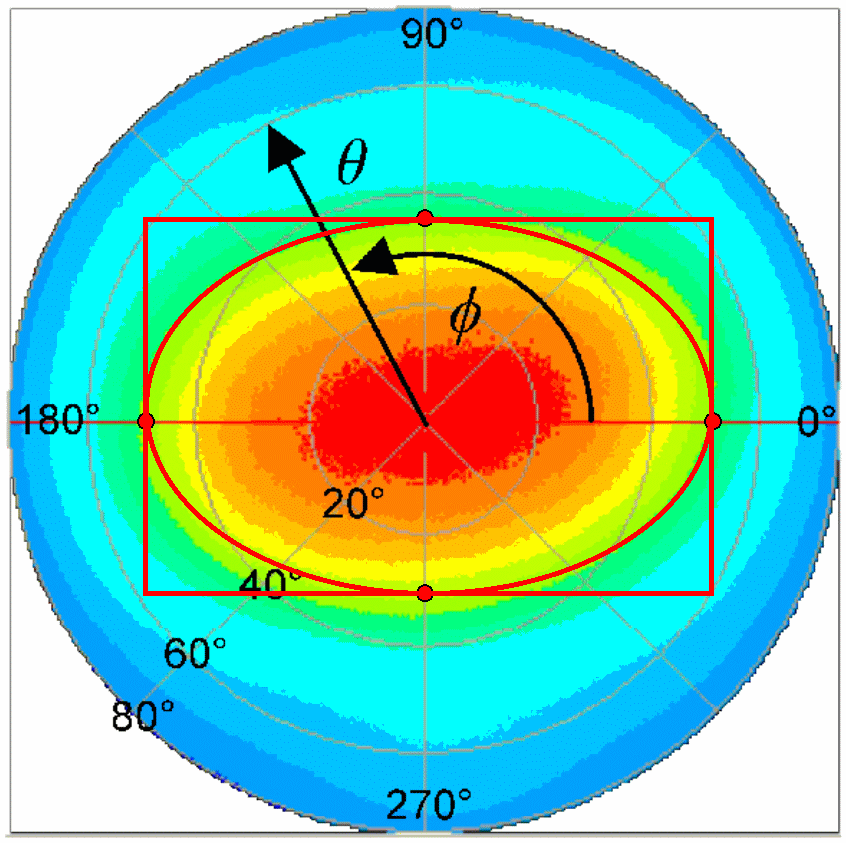
Figure 4: Illustration of the specification of the range of viewing directions (aka viewing cone) in a polar coordinate system. The pseudo-colors represent the value of a physical quantity (e.g. luminance) for each viewing direction.

The concept of the viewing cone has been introduced for the first time in the international standard ISO 13406-2:2001 "Ergonomic requirements for work with visual displays based on flat panels – Part 2: Ergonomic requirements for flat panel displays". This standard provides a classification for computer monitors with LCDs according to the range of viewing directions that can safely be used for the intended task (here: office work) without "reduced visual performance". The classification is according to "Viewing Direction Range Classes" with the "range of viewing directions" being equivalent to the viewing cone.

ISO 13406-2 describes a complex procedure according to which the usable viewing cone can be evaluated from measurements of luminance and chromaticity versus direction of observation. ISO 13406-2 introduces 4 viewing direction range classes of which the first (class I) is a wide viewing cone for many simultaneous observers and the last (class IV) is a so-called "privacy display" with a severely limited viewing cone.

Depending on the actual task to be performed with a certain display device (e.g. office work, entertainment, home theater. etc.) the requirements for the display are different. Compliance routes for different display applications can now be found in the successor standard ISO 9241-300.

Viewing directions are conveniently represented in a polar coordinate system with the angle of inclination, θ, being represented by the radial distance from the origin and the azimuth, Φ, increasing counterclockwise as shown in figure 4. In this coordinate system every point corresponds to one viewing direction. A viewing cone is thus defined by a locus (a closed line) in this coordinate system as indicated by the rectangle and the ellipse in fig. 4.

If a viewing cone is specified by four directions only (e.g. in the horizontal and the vertical plane), it does not become clear if it is the rectangle or the elliptical cone according to fig. 4. In order to resolve this ambiguity, the viewing cone should be specified by at least 8 directions, located in the horizontal and vertical plane and in the two diagonal planes (Φ = 45° and 135°).

Each direction in the polar coordinate system of fig. 4 can be assigned a (scalar) physical quantity, e.g. luminance, contrast, etc.. This quantity can then be represented by lines of equal values (contour lines), by shades of gray or by pseudo-colors (as shown in fig. 4).

A viewing cone can be defined starting from a certain application and the related geometry of observation, from which a range of directions can be obtained that specify the viewing cone required for that task. Inside this viewing cone certain physical parameters that are related to the visual performance of the display device must remain within certain (task dependent) limits.

A viewing cone can also result from measurements (versus viewing direction) carried out with a certain display device under specified operating conditions. Then the viewing cone is obtained by limiting values of a visual quantity (e.g. contrast) which for a certain application is required to be above e.g. 10 (compare e.g. Vesa FPDM2 307-4 Viewing-cone thresholds). Then the line for which the contrast equals 10 defines the viewing cone.

Recent experiments have shown that the acceptable viewing cone is rather determined by decrease of luminance and change of chromaticity than by the decrease of contrast. Comprehensive comparisons between experiments and measurements have been carried out in order to identify the quantities and the corresponding limiting values that define the apparent viewing cone for television screens with LCDs and PDPs. One of the results is that "the luminance at intermediate-to-high gray levels determines the viewingdirection dependent quality and not the contrast ratio." This is found to be in agreement with other research results that "find a low correlation between contrast ratio and visual assessment value". Furthermore, "not only the chromaticity coordinates of the primaries, but even more those of the white point play an important role and need to be included in a viewing direction dependent metric". The authors conclude that "for LCDs, this new metric results in a viewing cone, which is on the order of 70°–90° (subtended angle), and thus, considerably lower than what is usually specified based on a minimum contrast of 10. For PDPs, this new metric yields the same viewing direction range as the present specification that uses a luminance decrease to 50%". In the terminology as introduced above (and illustrated in Figure 2) a viewing cone of 70°–90° subtended angle means (for a rotationally symmetric viewing cone) a maximum angle of inclination of 35°-45°.

== Luminance and contrast versus viewing direction ==
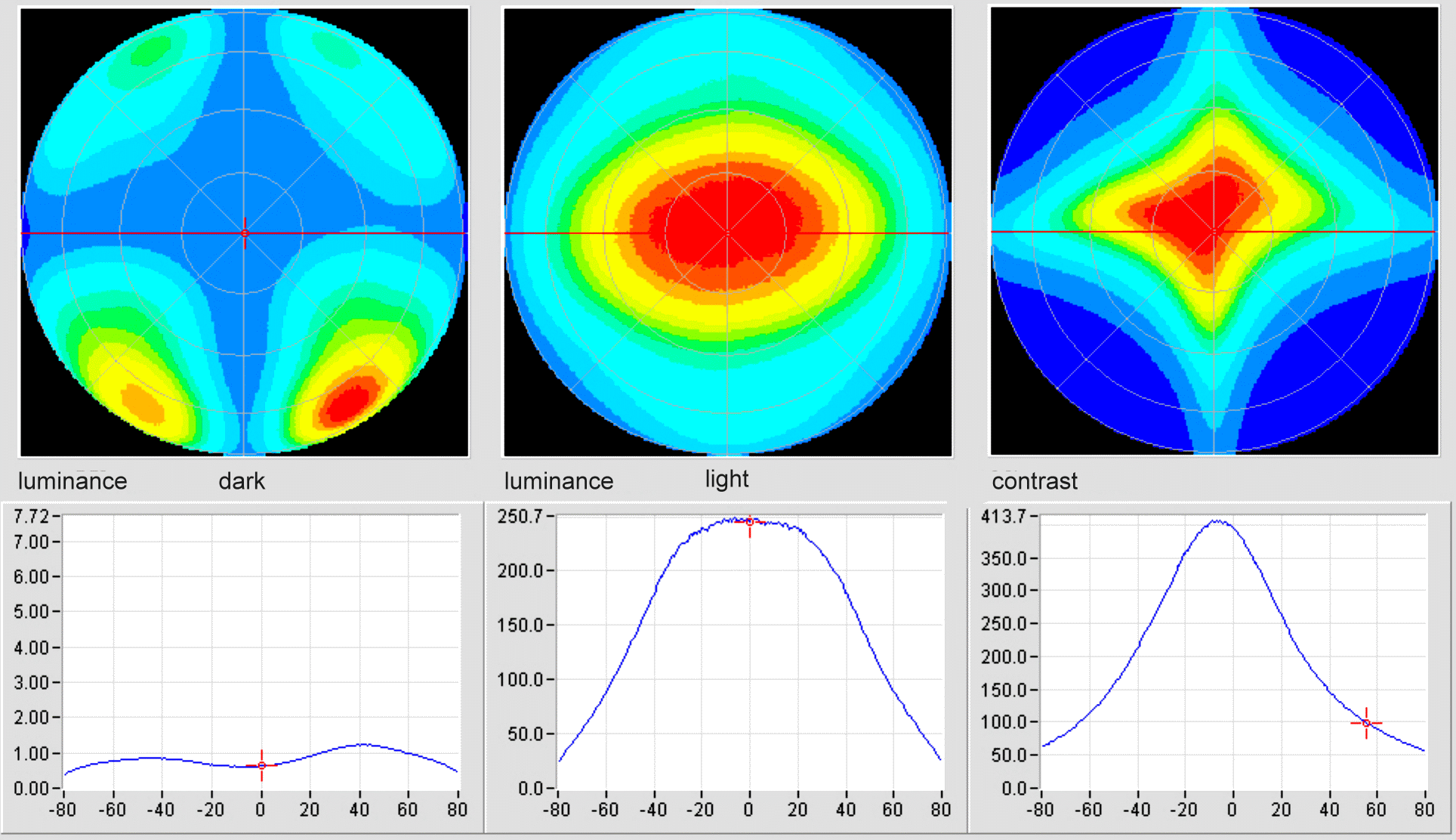
Figure 5: Luminance and contrast versus viewing direction in a polar coordinate system. The left column shows the directional luminance distribution of the dark state of the display (IPS LCD), the center column shows the bright state and the right column shows the (luminance) contrast (ratio) resulting from the preceding two luminance distributions. The value is coded by (pseudo) colors. The graphs below the polar coordinate systems each show a cross section in the horizontal plane and indicate the values for luminance and for the contrast. Each borderline between two (shades of) colors represents a line of constant value, in the case of contrast an iso-contrast (contour) line.

Fig. 5 shows luminance and contrast versus viewing direction in a polar coordinate system. The left column shows the directional luminance distribution of the dark state of the display (here: IPS-LCD), the center column shows the bright state and the right column shows the (luminance) contrast (ratio) resulting from the preceding two luminance distributions. The value is coded by (pseudo) colors. The graphs below the polar coordinate systems each show a cross section in the horizontal plane and indicate the values for luminance and for the contrast.

Each borderline between two (shades of) colors represents a line of constant value, in the case of contrast an iso-contrast (contour) line. Note, that "iso" is used here in the sense of "equal", it does NOT establish a relation to the International Organization for Standardization, ISO.

This way of representing the variation of a quantity of a display with direction of observation originates from an optical technique called conoscopy. Conoscopy, originally proposed and used by Maugin for examination of the state of liquid crystal alignment in 1911 has been used in every LCD-laboratory in the late seventies and throughout the eighties for measurement and evaluation of the optical properties of LCDs and for estimation of LCD-contrast as a function of viewing direction. In the conoscopic mode of observation, in the old days often realized with a polarizing microscope, a directions image is generated in the rear focal plane of the objective lens. This directions image is based on the same coordinates as the representation in the polar coordinate system shown in figs. 4 and 5.

The first publication of the variation of the contrast of reflective LCDs measured with a motorized mechanically scanning gonioscopic apparatus and represented as a conoscopic directions figure was published in 1979.

== See also ==
- Angular distance
- Field of view
- Visual field
