= Viewing angle =

Term in display technology

In display technology parlance, viewing angle is the angle at which a display can be viewed with an acceptable visual performance. In a technical context, the angular range is called viewing cone defined by a multitude of viewing directions. The viewing angle can be an angular range over which the display view is acceptable, or it can be the angle of generally acceptable viewing, such as a twelve o'clock viewing angle for a display optimized or viewing from the top.

The image may seem garbled, poorly saturated, of poor contrast, blurry, or too faint outside the stated viewing angle range, the exact mode of "failure" depends on the display type in question. For example, some projection screens reflect more light perpendicular to the screen and less light to the sides, making the screen appear much darker (and sometimes colors distorted) if the viewer is not in front of the screen. Many manufacturers of projection screens thus define the viewing angle as the angle at which the luminance of the image is exactly half of the maximum. With LCD screens, some manufacturers have opted to measure the contrast ratio and report the viewing angle as the angle where the contrast ratio exceeds 5:1 or 10:1, giving minimally acceptable viewing conditions.

The viewing angle is measured from one direction to the opposite, giving a maximum of 180° for a flat, one-sided screen. A display may exhibit different behavior in horizontal and vertical axes, requiring users and manufacturers to specify maximum usable viewing angles in both directions. Usually, the screens are designed to facilitate greater viewing angles at the horizontal level, and smaller angles at the vertical level, should the two of them differ in magnitude.

The viewing angle for some displays is specified in only a general direction, such as 6 o'clock or 12 o'clock.

Early LCDs had strikingly narrow viewing cones, a situation that has been improved with current technology.

Narrow viewing cones of some types of displays have also been used to bring a measure of security in businesses, where employees handle private information in the presence of customers, banks being one example. Rectangular privacy filters fitting to the computer monitors have also been sold as accessories.

== LEDs ==
LEDs are measured so that the line along half the viewing angle from directly forward is half the brightness as at directly forward.
