= List of Syracuse University people =

This is a list of people associated with Syracuse University, including founders, financial benefactors, notable alumni, notable educators, and speakers. Syracuse University has over 250,000 alumni representing all 50 states, the District of Columbia, and more than 170 countries and territories.

== Alumni ==
=== Academia ===
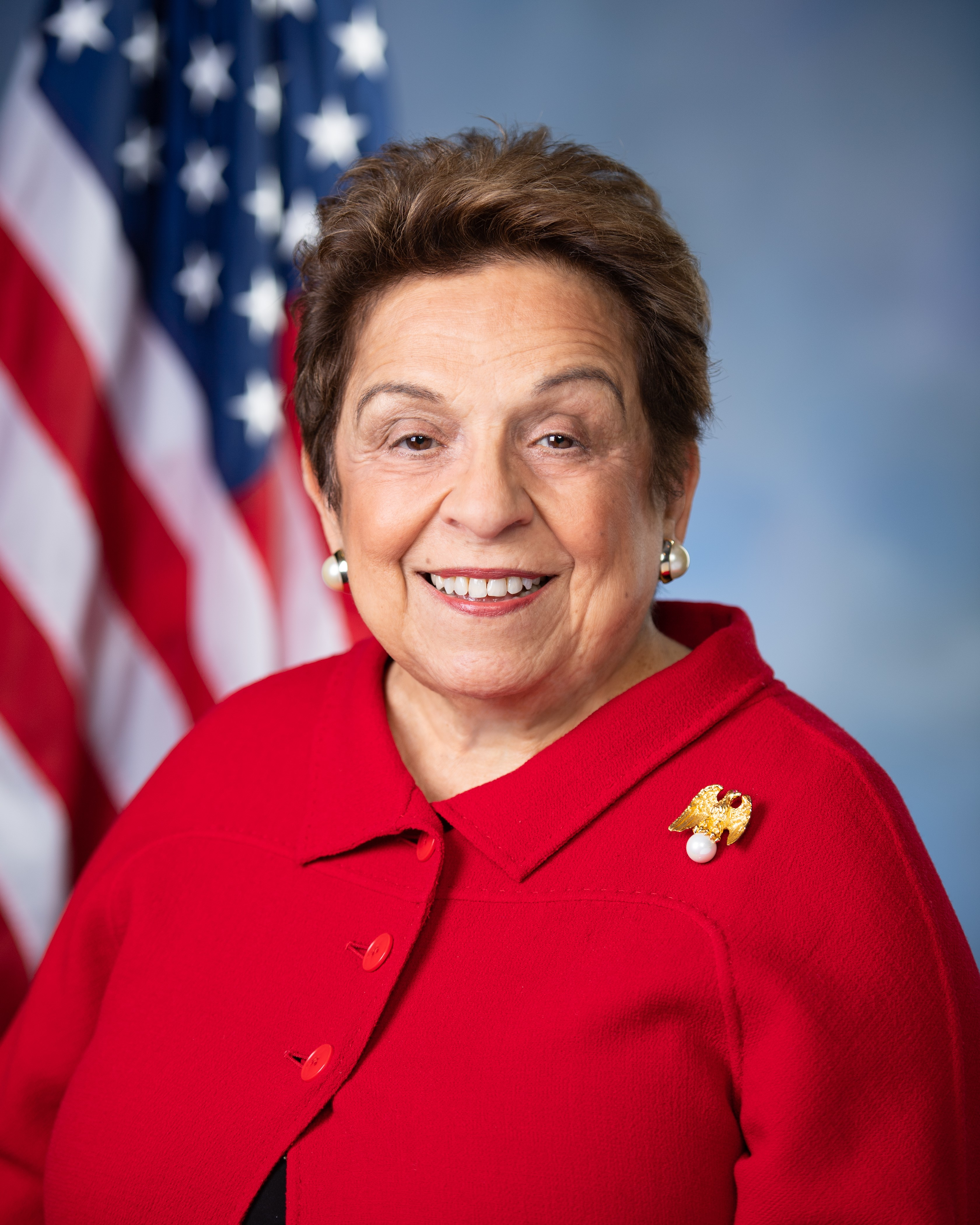
Donna Shalala

- Ishfaq Ahmad – professor of computer science and engineering at the University of Texas at Arlington
- Donna Alvermann – professor at the University of Georgia
- Betty Lise Anderson – professor at Ohio State University
- John Boardman – professor of physics and astronomy at Queens College and then Brooklyn College
- Daniela Bortoletto – Nicholas Kurti Senior Research Fellow at University of Oxford
- Molly Corbett Broad – president of the American Council on Education
- Walter Broadnax – president of Clark Atlanta University
- George Campbell Jr. – eleventh president of Cooper Union
- Mary Schmidt Campbell – president of Spelman College
- Kent John Chabotar – president of Guilford College
- Arthur Bridgman Clark – first head of the Art Department at Stanford University
- R. Inslee Clark, Jr. – director of admissions at Yale College
- Michael Crow – president of Arizona State University
- Mark Emmert – president of University of Washington
- Nina Fedoroff – academic at Pennsylvania State University
- Paul Finkelman –president and chancellor of Gratz College
- Moses Finley – academic and classical scholar
- Robert Finn – mathematician and professor
- Welthy Honsinger Fisher – founder of World Education and World Literacy Canada
- A. Lee Fritschler (MPA 1960, PhD 1965) – president of Dickinson College
- George E. Fox – astrobiologist and professor emeritus at the University of Houston.
- Jean Fréchet – chemist and professor emeritus at the University of California, Berkeley
- Jonathan Gibralter – president of the State University of New York at Farmingdale
- Joshua N. Goldberg – professor emeritus at Syracuse University
- Gabriela González – professor of physics and astronomy at Louisiana State University
- William Pratt Graham – professor and sixth chancellor of Syracuse University
- Shelley Haley – professor of classics and Africana studies at Hamilton College
- Kermit L. Hall – president of State University of New York at Albany and Utah State University
- Alice Ilchman – president of Sarah Lawrence College
- Hongxing Jiang – professor of electrical and computer engineering within the Edward E. Whitacre Jr. College of Engineering at Texas Tech University, inventor of the microLED display
- David Knapp – president of University of Massachusetts
- Joel Lebowitz – statistical physicist; George William Hill Professor of Mathematics and Physics at Rutgers University
- James F. Light – literary scholar, dean and provost of Lehman College
- Jingyu Lin – semiconductor physicist; professor of electrical and computer engineering with the Edward E. Whitacre Jr. College of Engineering at Texas Tech University
- Frederick D. Losey – Shakespearian scholar and elocutionist
- Jay Maddock – regents professor at Texas A&M University
- James MacKillop – professor and scholar of Celtic and Irish studies and an arts journalist
- Joanie Mahoney – 5th President of the State University of New York College of Environmental Science and Forestry
- Clifton E. Marsh – professor of social and public services at Tidewater Community College, chairman of the Social Science Department at Morris Brown College and the Department of Sociology at Hampton University
- Evangelia Micheli-Tzanakou – professor of biomedical engineering and the director of Computational Intelligence Laboratories at Rutgers University
- Barry Mills – president of Bowdoin College
- Pericles A. Mitkas – computer scientist and rector of the Aristotle University of Thessaloniki
- V. Parmeswaran Nair – theoretical particle physicist, distinguished professor at the City University of New York
- Ezra T. Newman – theoretical physicist, professor emeritus at the University of Pittsburgh, winner of the 2011 Einstein Prize
- Sean O'Keefe – chancellor of Louisiana State University (LSU)
- L. Jay Oliva – president of New York University
- Joy Osofsky – head of the Division of Pediatric Mental Health at the Louisiana State University School of Medicine
- Joseph Rallo – president of Angelo State University
- Pierre Ramond – professor emeritus of physics at University of Florida in Gainesville, Florida
- Mark Reckase – University Distinguished Professor Emeritus at Michigan State University
- Mark Reed – nanotechnology pioneer, Harold Hodgkinson chair at Yale University
- Elsa Reichmanis – faculty at Georgia Institute of Technology
- Karin Rodland – cancer cell biologist; professor emeritus at Oregon Health and Science University
- Joel Rosenbaum – professor of cell biology at Yale University
- Kenneth P. Ruscio – president of Washington and Lee University
- Rainer K. Sachs – professor emeritus of mathematics and physics at the University of California, Berkeley
- Donna Shalala – president of the University of Miami
- Pantur Silaban – professor of physics at Bandung Institute of Technology
- Deborah F. Stanley – president of the State University of New York at Oswego
- V. S. Subrahmanian – professor of computer science at Northwestern University
- Salvatore Torquato – chemistry professor at the Princeton Institute for the Science and Technology of Materials at Princeton University
- James Tour – professor of chemistry at Rice University
- José W. F. Valle – professor at the Spanish National Research Council CSIC
- Clarence Abiathar Waldo – professor of math and at Rose Polytechnic Institute; professor of mathematics at DePauw University; head professor of mathematics at Purdue University; and professor emeritus at Washington University in St. Louis.
- Mitchel B. Wallerstein – president of Baruch College and dean of the Maxwell School of Citizenship and Public Affairs
- David P. Weber – professor at the John Chambers College of Business and Economics at West Virginia University

=== Activism and nonprofits ===
- Marc S. Ellenbogen – president of the Prague Society for International Cooperation
- David Gurfein – CEO of United American Patriots
- Maude B. Perkins – national general secretary of the Young People’s Branch of the Woman's Christian Temperance Union
- Lawrence Rudner – vice president for research and psychometrics at the Graduate Management Admission Council (GMAC).

=== Architecture ===
- Princess Rajwa Al Hussein – architect; member of the Jordanian royal family
- Thomas Wilson Boyde Jr. (1905–1981) – first Black architect in Rochester, New York
- Massimo Carmassi – architect
- Bruce Fowle – architect, Fox & Fowle Architects
- James Garrison – architect, Garrison Architects
- Adam Gross – architect, Ayers Saint Gross
- Wilbur R. Ingalls, Jr. – architect
- Lorimer Rich – architect, designed the Tomb of the Unknowns in Washington, DC and the Tomb of the Unknown Revolutionary War Soldier in Rome, NY

=== Art ===
- Elfriede Abbe – sculptor
- Brad Anderson – cartoonist and creator of the comic strip Marmaduke
- Robb Armstrong – cartoonist and creator of the comic strip Jump Start
- Bonnie August – fashion designer
- Harriete Estel Berman – artist
- James Bishop – painter
- Nydia Blas – photographer
- Gordon Chandler – sculptor
- Virginia Cuthbert – artist
- Frances Farrand Dodge – painter, illustrator, and teacher
- Birgitta Moran Farmer – artist who won the 1906 Hiram Gee Award in Painting
- Scott Froschauer – artist and sculptor
- Sharon Gold – artist and professor
- Clement Greenberg – art critic
- Henry Grethel – fashion designer
- Betsey Johnson – fashion designer
- Joseph S. Kozlowski – portrait and watercolor artist
- Hilton Kramer – art critic and essayist
- Barbara Kruger – conceptual artist and collagist
- Sol LeWitt – artist
- Mark Lombardi – neo-conceptual artist
- Jenni Lukac – audio-visual artist
- Bob Mankoff – cartoonist and cartoon editor for The New Yorker
- Scott McCloud – cartoonist and comics theorist
- Joe McNally – photographer
- Aribert Munzner – artist
- John Pfahl – photographer
- William Powhida – artist
- Jimmy Ridlon – sports painter and sculptor, also a professional football player
- Claire Seidl – artist
- Jack Tippit – cartoonist
- Kate Vrijmoet – artist
- Lori Weitzner – textile designer
- Stephanie Welsh – Pulitzer Prize-winning photographer turned midwife

=== Business and finance ===
- P.O. Ackley – gunsmith and CEO, P.O. Ackley Inc.
- Russ Alben – advertising executive, created the Timex tagline, "It takes a licking and keeps on ticking"
- Dean Alvord – developer known best for developing Belle Terre, New York, Prospect Park South, and Roslyn Estates, New York
- Martin Bandier – chairman and CEO of Sony/ATV
- Ben Baldanza – airline executive and CEO of Spirit Airlines
- Harley Baldwin – developer in Aspen, Colorado
- Rostin Behnam – chairman of the United States Commodity Futures Trading Commission
- Al-Waleed bin Talal – founder and president of Kingdom Holding Company
- William J. Brodsky – chairman and CEO of the Chicago Board Options Exchange
- Stanley Chais – investment advisor in the Madoff investment scandal
- Dennis Crowley – co-founder of Foursquare
- Mary C. Daly – president and CEO of the Federal Reserve Bank of San Francisco
- Daniel A. D'Aniello – co-founder and chairman of the Carlyle Group
- Nick Donofrio – senior vice president of Technology and Manufacturing for IBM
- David Falk – sports agent and founder of SFX Basketball Group
- Susan Feeney – partner at GMMB and senior editor for NPR
- Bernard Goldberg (1948) – co-founder of Raymour & Flanigan
- Peter Guber – CEO of Mandalay Entertainment and co-owner of the Golden State Warriors
- Deborah Henretta – group president of Procter & Gamble
- E. Floyd Kvamme – partner emeritus of Kleiner, Perkins, Caufield & Byers
- Chris Licht – chairman and CEO of CNN
- Richard Menschel – senior director of Goldman Sachs
- Robert Menschel – senior director of Goldman Sachs
- Donald Newhouse – president of Advance Publications
- Samuel Irving Newhouse Jr. – chairman and CEO of Advance Publications; chairman of Condé Nast Publications
- Sean O'Keefe – chairman of Airbus Group, Inc.
- Lowell W. Paxson – founder of Home Shopping Network
- Kirthiga Reddy – managing director of Facebook India
- Arthur Rock – ventuame capitalist, co-founder of Intel
- David Rockwell – founder and CEO of the Rockwell Group
- Steve Rubell – Studio 54 owner
- Ian Schrager – hotelier and Studio 54 owner
- Peggy Siegal – entertainment publicist, media strategist, founder of Peggy Siegal Company
- Vishal Sikka – CEO and managing director of Infosys
- Rajesh Subramaniam – CEO and president of FedEx
- John Sykes – president of iHeartMedia
- Abhay Vakil – businessman and non-executive director of Asian Paints Ltd
- George Warrington – NJ Transit president and Amtrak president
- Martin J. Whitman – founder and co-chief investment officer Third Avenue Management
- Sigi Ziering – president of the Diagnostic Products Corporation
- John Zogby – pollster with Zogby International

=== Entertainment ===
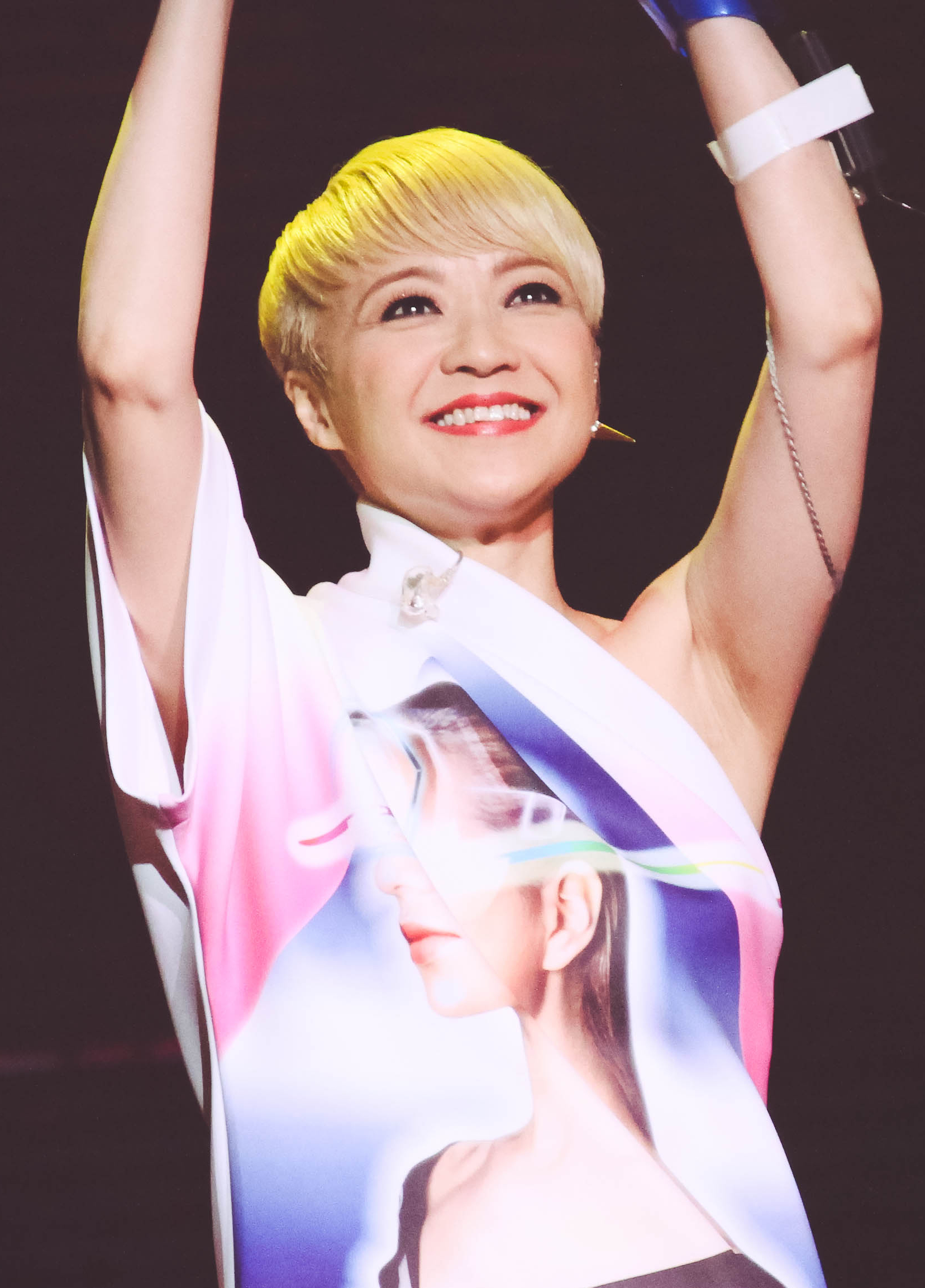
Priscilla Chan

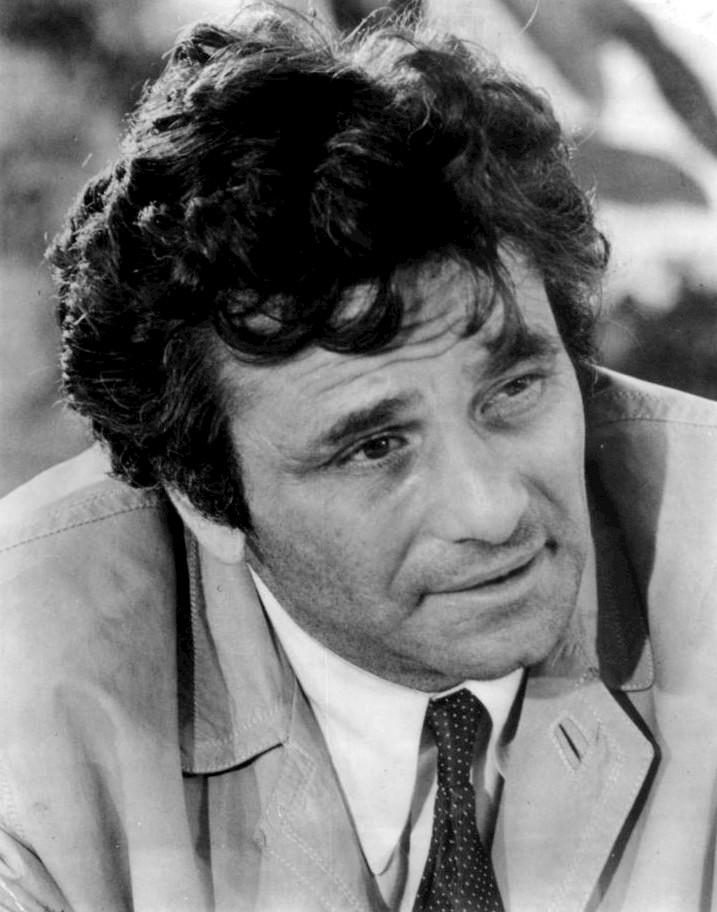
Peter Falk

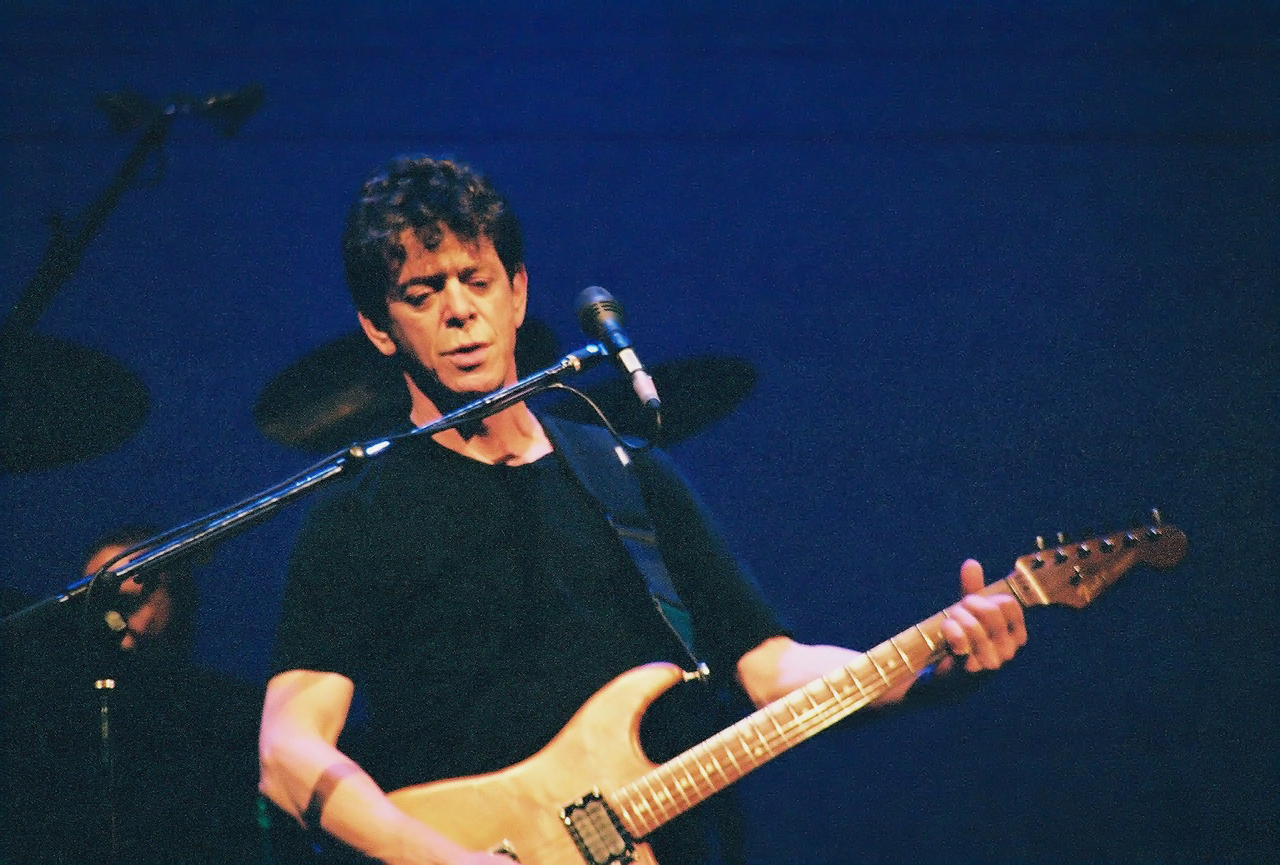
Lou Reed

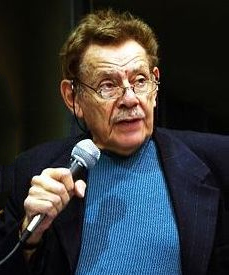
Jerry Stiller

- Lynn Ahrens – musical theatre lyricist
- Nilo Alcala – composer; recipient of the Aaron Copland House Residency Award
- David Amber – television anchor for ESPN
- Damon Amendolara – sportscaster
- Michael Barkann – sportscaster for NBC Sports Philadelphia
- Darryl Bell – actor
- Len Berman – sportscaster
- Matthew Berry – ESPN fantasy sports analyst
- Craig Borten – screenwriter
- Paul Bouche – television producer and media personality
- Eric Bress – film director and screenwriter
- Contessa Brewer – broadcast journalist with MSNBC
- Samantha Brown – television personality
- Steve Bunin – sportscaster with ESPN
- Ryan Burr – sportscaster with ESPN, NBC, and the Golf Channel
- Mary Calvi – anchor at WCBS-TV
- Tim Calpin – screenwriter
- Craig Carton – co-host of Boomer and Carton in the Morning
- Warren Casey – writer, lyricist, and screenwriter
- Joe Castiglione – Boston Red Sox radio announcer
- Felix Cavaliere – singer with The Rascals
- Priscilla Chan – singer
- Ernest Chappell – radio and television announcer
- Clairo – singer-songwriter
- Dick Clark – television personality known for American Bandstand and Dick Clark's New Year's Rockin' Eve
- Claud – singer-songwriter
- Michael Cole – WWE commentator
- Ed Coleman – sportscaster with WFAN
- Bob Costas – sportscaster for NBC Sports and MLB Network
- John Curran – film director and screenwriter
- Alexandra Curtis – Miss Rhode Island 2015
- Denise D'Ascenzo – television news anchorwoman with WFSB
- Doug Davis –Grammy Award-winning producer
- Taye Diggs – actor
- Bob Dotson – television host
- Eric J Dubowsky – Emmy Award and Grammy Award-winning musician and producer
- Heather Dubrow – cast member on The Real Housewives of Orange County
- Ian Eagle – sportscaster with CBS and YES
- Noah Eagle – sportscaster with NBC Sports
- Zach Tyler Eisen – voice actor; voice of Aang on Avatar: The Last Airbender
- Emme – plus-size model and television host
- Spike Eskin – radio personality with WIP
- Peter Falk – actor
- Gary Farmer – actor
- Vera Farmiga – actress
- Wally Feresten – cue card supervisor for Saturday Night Live
- Thom Filicia – interior designer and television host of Queer Eye for the Straight Guy
- Carlisle Floyd – composer known for his operas
- Judy Freudberg – screenwriter
- Marty Glickman – sportscaster
- Jeff Glor – anchor with CBS Evening News
- Ken Goldstein – musician known as Jack Dempsey; author
- Jami Gong – stand-up comedian
- Carl Gottlieb – screenwriter; vice-president of the Writers Guild of America, West
- Dan Gurewitch – comedian and actor
- Scott Hanson – sportscaster with the NFL Network; host of NFL RedZone
- Vaughn Harper – broadcast announcer and DJ
- Beth Harrington – filmmaker and musician
- Ariel Helwani – MMA journalist
- Elizabeth Hendrickson – actress
- Jay Harrington – actor
- Bob Holz – musician
- Miriam Hopkins – actress
- Larry Hryb – director of programming for Xbox Live
- Garland Jeffreys – musician
- David N. Johnson – organist, composer, educator, and choral clinician
- Miss Jones – radio DJ and singer
- Irma Kalish – television writer
- Megyn Kelly – news anchor with the Fox News Channel
- Joe Klotz – film editor
- Ted Koppel – broadcast journalist and anchor for Nightline
- Steve Kroft – co-editor and news correspondent for 60 Minutes
- Lisa Lampanelli – comedian
- Frank Langella – actor, known for Frost/Nixon
- Meg LeFauve – screenwriter of Inside Out, Captain Marvel
- Sheldon Leonard – film and television actor, producer, director, and writer
- Riki Lindhome – actress
- Sam Lloyd – actor, musician
- Gap Mangione – musician and recording artist
- Frank Marion – motion picture pioneer
- Donald Martino – Pulitzer Prize-winning composer
- Edie McClurg - actress
- Neal McDonough – actor
- Sean McDonough – sportscaster with ESPN
- Andy Mineo – rapper, singer, producer, director, actor, and minister
- Jeanne Moos – news correspondent with CNN
- Jim_Morris - film producer and president of Pixar
- Sterling Morrison – musician
- Jessie Mueller – Tony Award-winning actress
- Will Murray – researcher and segment producer for The Howard Stern Show
- Jim Naughtie –radio presenter
- Diane Nelson – president of DC Entertainment; president and chief content officer of Warner Bros. Interactive Entertainment
- Bob Neumeier – sportscaster with NBC
- Greg Papa – sportscaster for the Oakland Raiders
- Dave Pasch – sportscaster with ESPN
- Jeff Passan – baseball journalist for ESPN
- Palm Beach Pete – social media influencer
- Scott Pioli – analyst for Football Night in America, NBC Sports Network's Pro Football Talk, Sirius XM NFL Radio and the NFL Network
- Suzanne Pleshette – actress
- Mike Pollock – voice actor
- Cory Provus - sportscaster for the Minnesota Twins
- Lou Reed – musician
- Kevin Michael Richardson – actor
- Sam Roberts – radio broadcaster
- Dave Roberts – weatherman, broadcaster and presenter for WPVI-TV
- Sam Roberts – professional wrestling personality, radio host, and podcaster known for the Jim Norton & Sam Roberts
- Doug Robinson – television producer
- Dan Roche – sportscaster with WBZ-TV
- Dave Ryan – sportscaster with ESPN
- Maria Sansone – television presenter
- Adam Schein – sportscaster with SiriusXM and CBS Sports Network.
- Ken Schretzmann – film editor specializing in animated films; winner of the Ace Eddie Award for Toy Story 3
- Reid Scott – actor
- Tom Everett Scott – actor
- Henry Selick – director and animator
- Bob Shannon – radio DJ and announcer with WCBS-FM
- Anish Shroff – ESPNews anchor
- Andrew Siciliano – Cleveland Browns play-by-play announcer,sportscaster for the NFL Network, host of DirecTV Red Zone Channel
- Kate Siegel - actress
- Fred Silverman – president of NBC
- Lakshmi Singh – newscaster for NPR
- Aaron Sorkin – Emmy Award and Academy Award-winning screenwriter, known for A Few Good Men, The Social Network, The West Wing, and Moneyball
- Jayson Stark – sportscaster with ESPN
- Lexington Steele – actor, director, and owner of Mercenary Motion Pictures and Black Viking Pictures Inc.
- Jerry Stiller – actor
- Dick Stockton – sportscaster
- Habib Tabani – ghazal singer
- Andrew Taggart – member of The Chainsmokers
- Arielle Tepper – Broadway producer
- Mark Tinker – television producer and director
- Mike Tirico – sportscaster with NBC
- Stephen A. Unger – executive recruiter, columnist for Daily Variety
- Jimmy Van Heusen – Academy Award-winning composer
- Bill Viola – video artist
- Michael H. Weber – screenwriter of (500) Days of Summer, The Spectacular Now, The Fault in Our Stars, Paper Towns
- Peter Weller – actor
- Vanessa Williams – singer-songwriter, actress, dancer, and Miss America
- Nick Wright – television host with Fox Sports 1
- Howard Wyeth – drummer and pianist
- Pete Yorn – musician
- Justin Robert Young – podcaster, journalist, comedian, and writer
- Adam Zucker – sportscaster and anchor with CBS Sports Network

=== Law ===
- Bob Antonacci – New York Supreme Court judge and New York State Senate member
- Andrew P. Bakaj – U.S. attorney and lead counsel for the whistleblower during the Impeachment Inquiry and Impeachment of President Donald Trump
- Beau Biden – Delaware Attorney General; son of President Joe Biden
- George Fletcher Chandler – first superintendent of the New York State Police
- David Crane – chief prosecutor of the Special Court for Sierra Leone
- James E. Graves, Jr. – United States Court of Appeals judge for the Fifth Circuit judge; Supreme Court of Mississippi justice
- Neal P. McCurn – senior judge for the United States District Court for the Northern District of New York
- Theodore McKee – chief judge of the United States Court of Appeals for the Third Circuit
- Norman A. Mordue – chief judge for the United States District Court for the Northern District of New York
- Elliott Portnoy – lawyer and CEO of Dentons
- John Prevas – circuit court judge, City of Baltimore
- Frederick J. Scullin, Jr. – senior judge for the United States District Court for the Northern District of New York
- Glenn T. Suddaby – justice for the United States District Court for the Northern District of New York
- Sandra L. Townes – justice for the United States District Court for the Eastern District of New York

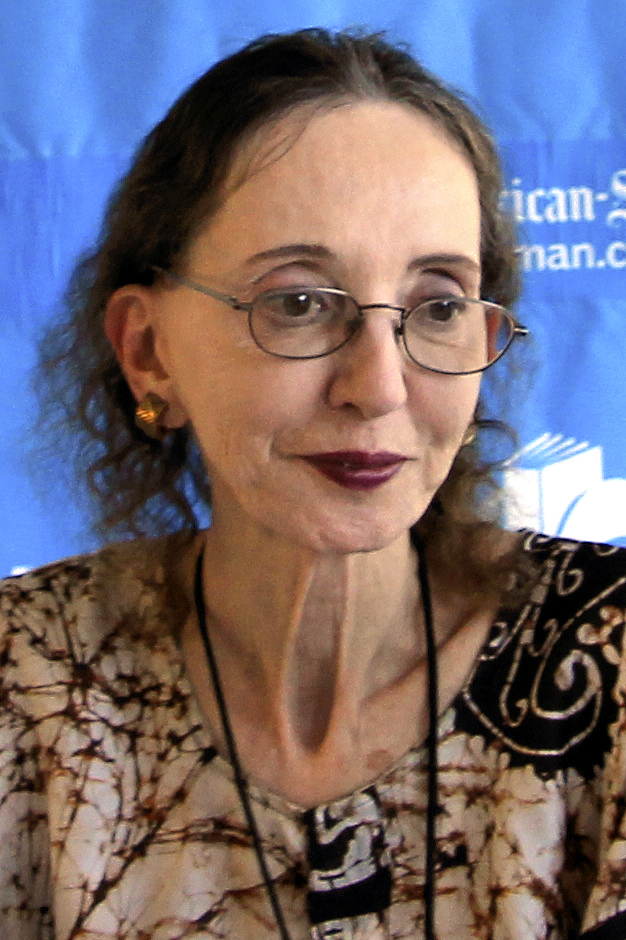
Joyce Carol Oates

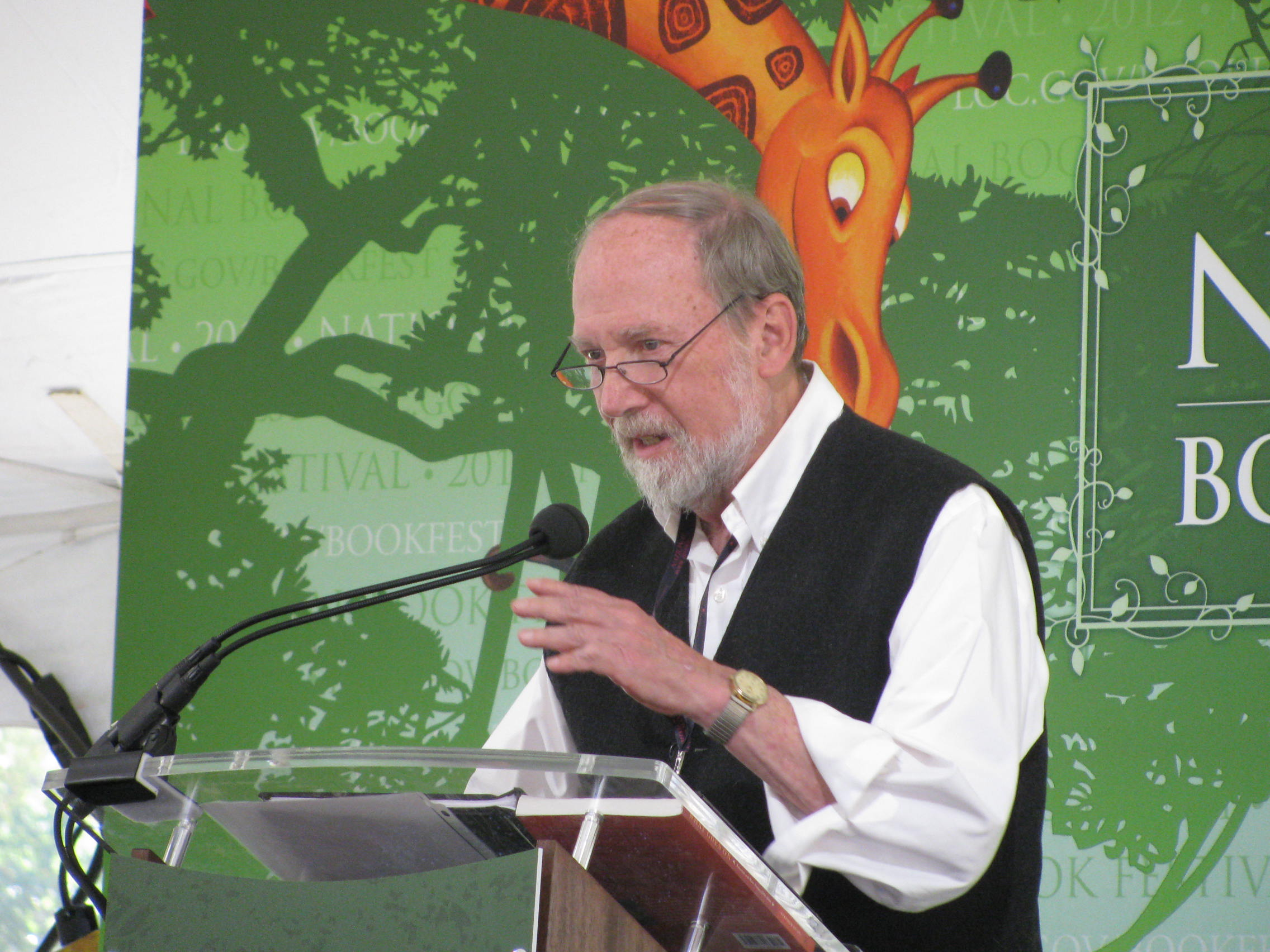
Stephen Dunn

=== Literature and journalism ===
- Julia Alvarez – poet, novelist, and essayist
- Joe Amato – writer and poet
- Joel Brouwer – poet, professor, and critic
- Marilyn Burns – author of over a dozen children's books on mathematics
- Wendy Coakley-Thompson – author
- Stephen Crane – poet, novelist, and short story writer
- Mabel Potter Daggett – writer, journalist, editor, and suffragist
- Aleš Debeljak – cultural critic, poet, and essayist
- Stephen Dunn – poet and educator who won the 2001 Pulitzer Prize for Poetry
- Whitney Gaskell – author
- Beth Gylys – poet and professor of English and creative writing at Georgia State University
- Wendy Anderson Halperin – illustrator and author of children's books
- Daniel J. Halstead – publisher of The Syracuse Daily Union, The Syracuse Daily Courier and Union, The Syracuse Daily Courier, and The Syracuse Courier
- Susan Joy Hassol – author and science communicator
- Michael Herr – writer and war correspondent
- Shirley Jackson – writer known for her works of horror and mystery
- Morton L. Janklow – literary agent
- Avery Yale Kamila – vegan food columnist for the Portland Press Herald
- Larry Kramer – president and publisher of USA Today
- Michael Kranish – journalist with The Boston Globe
- Akshay Nanavati – author of Fearvana
- Mike McAlary – Pulitzer Prize-winning journalist
- John D. MacDonald – writer of novels and short stories
- Don Maloney – author
- Barry N. Malzberg – writer and editor
- Jerre Mangione – writer and scholar
- Mary Emma Griffith Marshall – editor and librarian for the Bureau of Markets, U.S. Department of Agriculture
- Jay McInerney – novelist, screenwriter, editor, and columnist
- Joyce Carol Oates – novelist
- Robert O'Connor – novelist
- Tom Perrotta – novelist and screenwriter
- Salvador Plascencia – novelist
- Kim Ponders – novelist
- Mary Jo Putney – romance novelist
- Henry Jarvis Raymond – founder of The New York Times
- M. J. Rose – novelist
- Harry M. Rosenfeld – editor for the Washington Post
- William Safire – Pulitzer Prize-winning commentator and The New York Times columnist
- George Saunders – short-story writer
- Robert Scheer – editor-in-chief of TruthDig, managing editor of Ramparts, professor of USC Annenberg School for Communication and Journalism
- Arun Shourie – editor of Times of India and Indian Express
- Alice Sebold – novelist
- Laurie Gwen Shapiro – novelist
- Anthony Veasna So – short story writer
- Esther Baker Steele – author
- Cheryl Strayed – novelist, memoirist, and essayist
- Elizabeth Strout – novelist
- William Tester – short story writer
- Dorothy Thompson – journalist and radio broadcaster
- Ada Josephine Todd – author and educator
- Ryan Van Winkle – poet
- Priit Vesilind – journalist with National Geographic
- Irene Vilar – author and literary agent
- John A. Williams – novelist

=== Politics ===
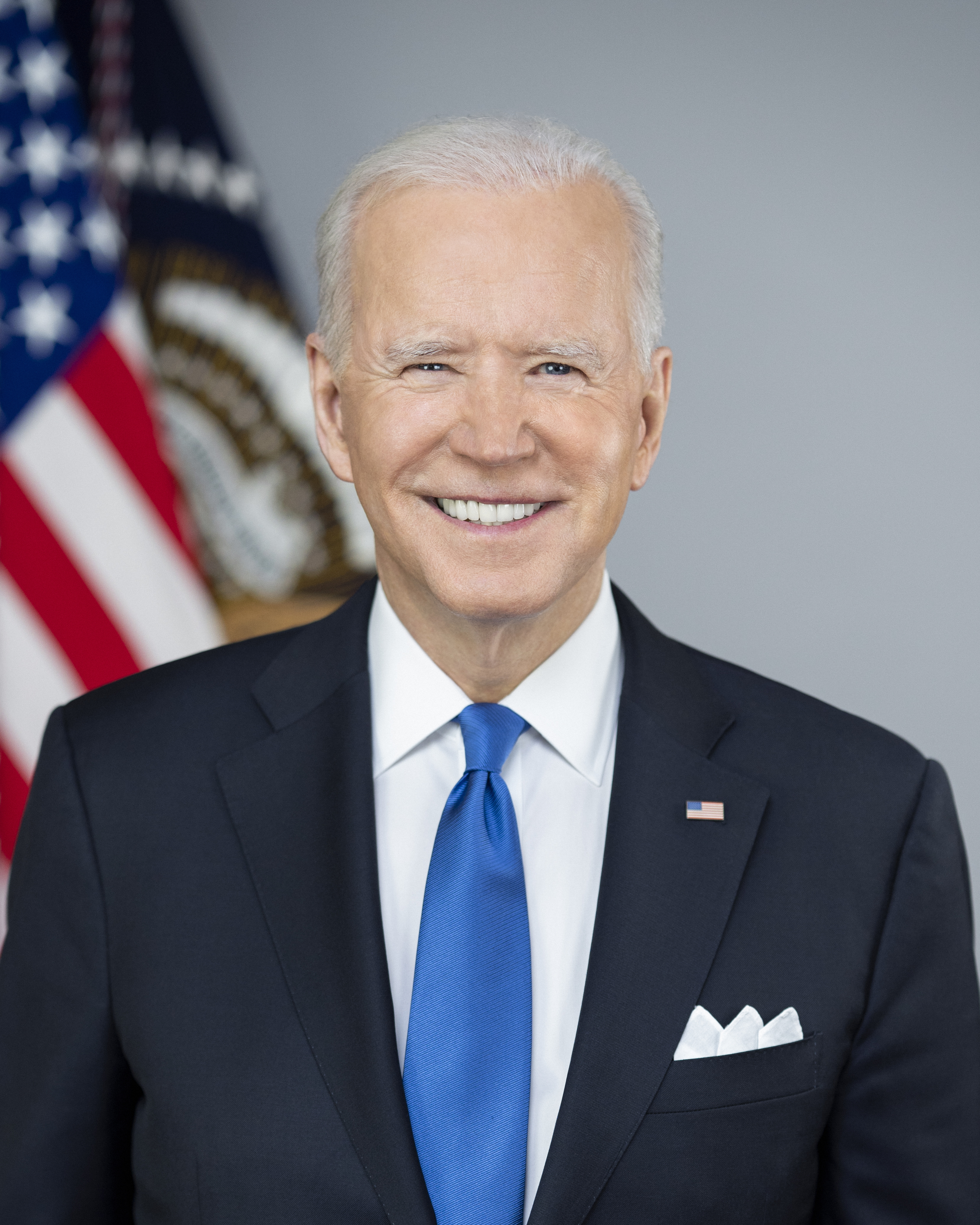
Joe Biden

- Amir Hamzah Azizan – Minister of Finance (Malaysia)
- Craig Benson – Governor of New Hampshire
- Joe Biden – President of the United States, Vice President of the United States, United States Senate
- Carolyn Bourdeaux – United States House of Representatives
- Jon Bramnick – New Jersey Senate and New Jersey General Assembly
- Angus Cameron – United States Senate, Speaker of the Wisconsin State Assembly, and Wisconsin Senate
- Gary Chan – Legislative Council of Hong Kong
- John T. Connor – United States Secretary of Commerce
- Al D'Amato – United States Senate
- Willy De Clercq – European Commissioner for Trade, European Commissioner for External Relations, and Minister of Finance (Belgium)
- John DeFrancisco – New York State Senate
- Tesfaye Dinka – Prime Minister of Ethiopia
- Robert Duffy – Lieutenant Governor of New York, Mayor of Rochester, and chief of the Rochester Police Department
- Kwabena Dufuor – Minister for Finance and Economic Planning and governor of the Bank of Ghana
- Ron George – Maryland House of Delegates
- Stanley L. Greigg – United States House of Representatives and Mayor of Sioux City, Iowa
- Alphonse A. Haettenschwiller – New Hampshire House of Representatives
- Steve Hagerty – Mayor of Evanston, Illinois
- Arthur T. Hannett – Governor of New Mexico
- Kathy Hochul – Governor of New York, Lieutenant Governor of New York, and United States House of Representatives
- John Katko – United States House of Representatives
- Randy Kuhl – United States House of Representatives and New York State Assembly
- Mordecai Lee – Wisconsin State Assembly and Wisconsin State Senate
- Belva A. Lockwood (GC) – ran for president in 1884 and 1888 for the Equal Rights Party, first woman to be admitted to practice law before the Supreme Court of the United States
- Bill Magnarelli – New York State Assembly
- Rodney C. Moen – Wisconsin State Senate.
- Toby Moffett – United States House of Representatives
- John H. Mulroy – 1st executive of Onondaga County, New York
- Bismarck Myrick – US Ambassador to Liberia and US Amassador to Lesotho
- Phenton Neymour, Parliament of the Bahamas for South Beach and Minister of State for the Environment
- Masahide Ōta – Governor of Okinawa Prefecture and House of Councillors
- Alexis Mercedes Rinck – Seattle City Council
- Steve Rothman – United States House of Representatives and Mayor of Englewood
- Kalyan Roy – Parliament of India
- Warren Rudman – United States Senator and Attorney General of New Hampshire
- Donna Shalala – United States House of Representatives; United States Secretary of Health and Human Services; chancellor of the University of Wisconsin, Madison; president of the University of Miami, The New School, and Hunter College
- Salvador del Solar – Prime Minister of Peru and Minister of Culture
- John H. Terry – United States House of Representatives and New York State Assembly
- Deborah VanAmerongen – Commissioner of the New York State Division of Housing and Community Renewal
- Ben Walsh – Mayor of Syracuse
- John P. White – United States Deputy Secretary of Defense

=== Military ===
- Wilmeth Sidat-Singh – U.S. Army Air Corps officer with the Tuskegee Airmen
- Harry L. Twaddle – U.S. Army major general
- Forrest Vosler – World War II Medal of Honor recipient

=== Religion ===
- Maltbie D. Babcock – senior minister of Brown Memorial Presbyterian Church
- Jane Dempsey Douglass – feminist theologian, ecclesiastical historian, and president of the World Alliance of Reformed Churches
- Borys Gudziak – Catholic bishop, Metropolitan-Archbishop of Philadelphia (Ukrainian Greek Catholic)
- Oren Lyons – Faithkeeper of the Onondaga Nation and Seneca Nation
- Michael Yeung Ming-cheung – Catholic Bishop, eighth Bishop of the Roman Catholic Diocese of Hong Kong

=== Science, engineering, and medicine ===
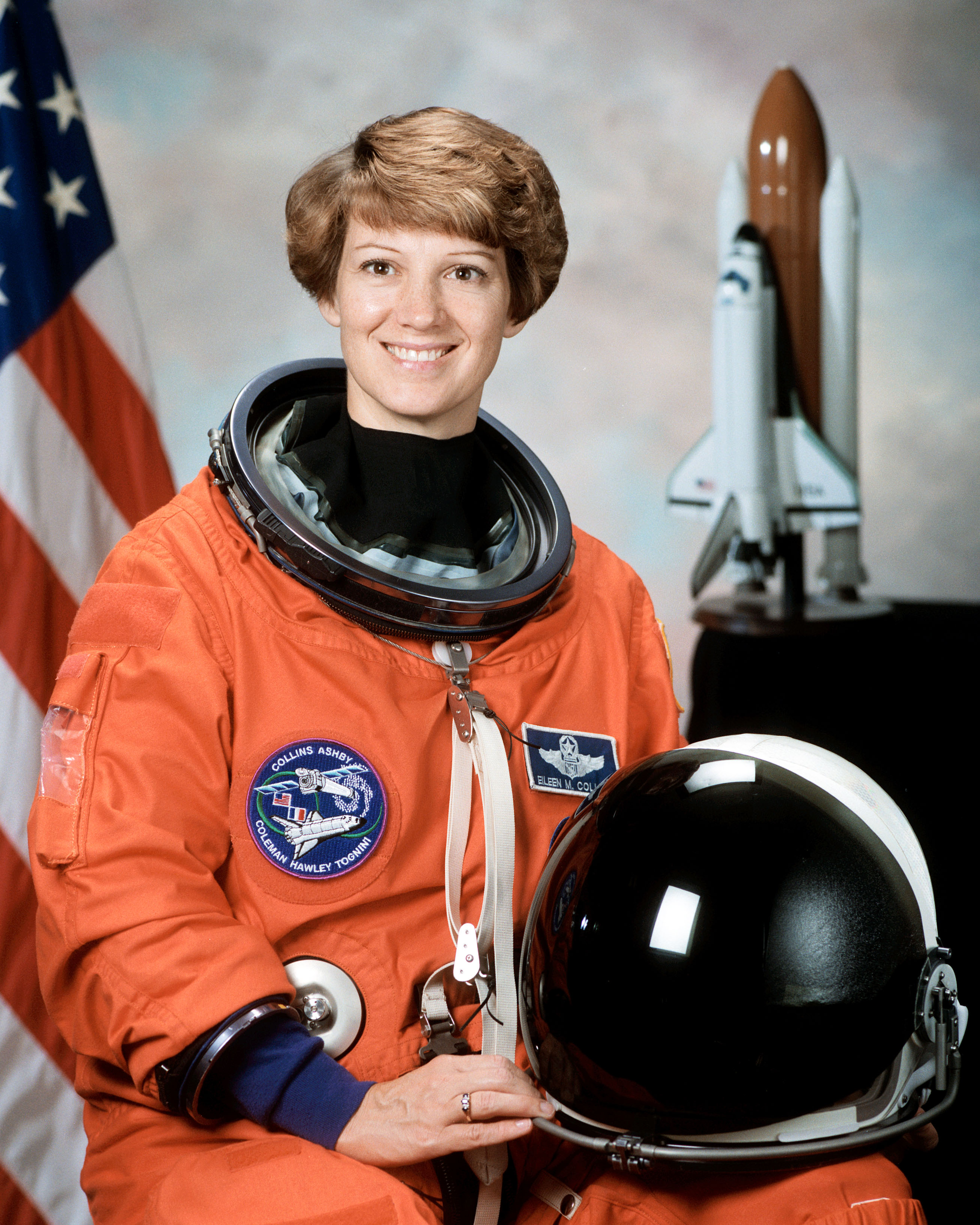
Eileen Collins

- Joseph A. Ahearn – civil engineer of the U.S. Air Force; member of the National Academy of Engineering
- Albert Baez – developer of the X-ray reflection microscope, physics educator, and father of Joan Baez
- Charles F. Brannock – inventor and manufacturer; inventor of the Brannock Device
- Rubin Braunstein – semiconductor physics, pioneer of LEDs, 2000 and 2014 Nobel Prizes in Physics
- Penny Budoff – physician and medical researcher; author of No More Hot Flashes and Even More Good News
- Eileen Collins – NASA astronaut and first female Space Shuttle commander
- Alice Carter Cook – botanist and writer, first woman to receive a PhD in botany from an American university
- Joan Feynman – astrophysicist with NASA Ames Research Center
- Edith M. Flanigen – chemist at Union Carbide; winner of the 2014 National Medal of Technology and Innovation
- Barry Gingell – internist, nutritionist, computer scientist and AIDS activist
- Hermann Gummel – semiconductor device physicist; member of the National Academy of Engineering
- John J. Hopfield – spectroscopist with the Johns Hopkins University Applied Physics Laboratory and at the Naval Research Laboratory
- Robert Jarvik – inventor of the first permanently implantable artificial heart
- Gilles Martin – engineer, founder and executive chairman of Eurofins Scientific
- William Ralph Maxon – botanist and pteridologist with the National Museum of Natural History
- Story Musgrave – NASA astronaut
- Sean O'Keefe – NASA administrator
- Yude Pan – forest ecologist with the USDA Forest Service, and a senior investigator of the Harvard Forest at Harvard University
- Martin A. Pomerantz – astrophysicist, president emeritus of the Bartol Research Institute, and pioneer of Antarctic astronomy
- Harry Frederick Recher – ornithologist with the Australian Museum; winner of the 1994 D.L. Serventy Medal
- Charles Rosen – founder of SRI International's Artificial Intelligence Center; co-founder of Ridge Vineyards;
- Sultan bin Salman Al Saud – a Saudi prince; the first Arab and the first Muslim to fly in space, and the youngest person ever to fly on a space shuttle
- Michael Streicher – metallurgist and engineer; developer of stainless steels; winner of the W. R. Whitney Award
- Vincenzo C. Vannicola – electrical engineer at General Electric

=== Sports ===
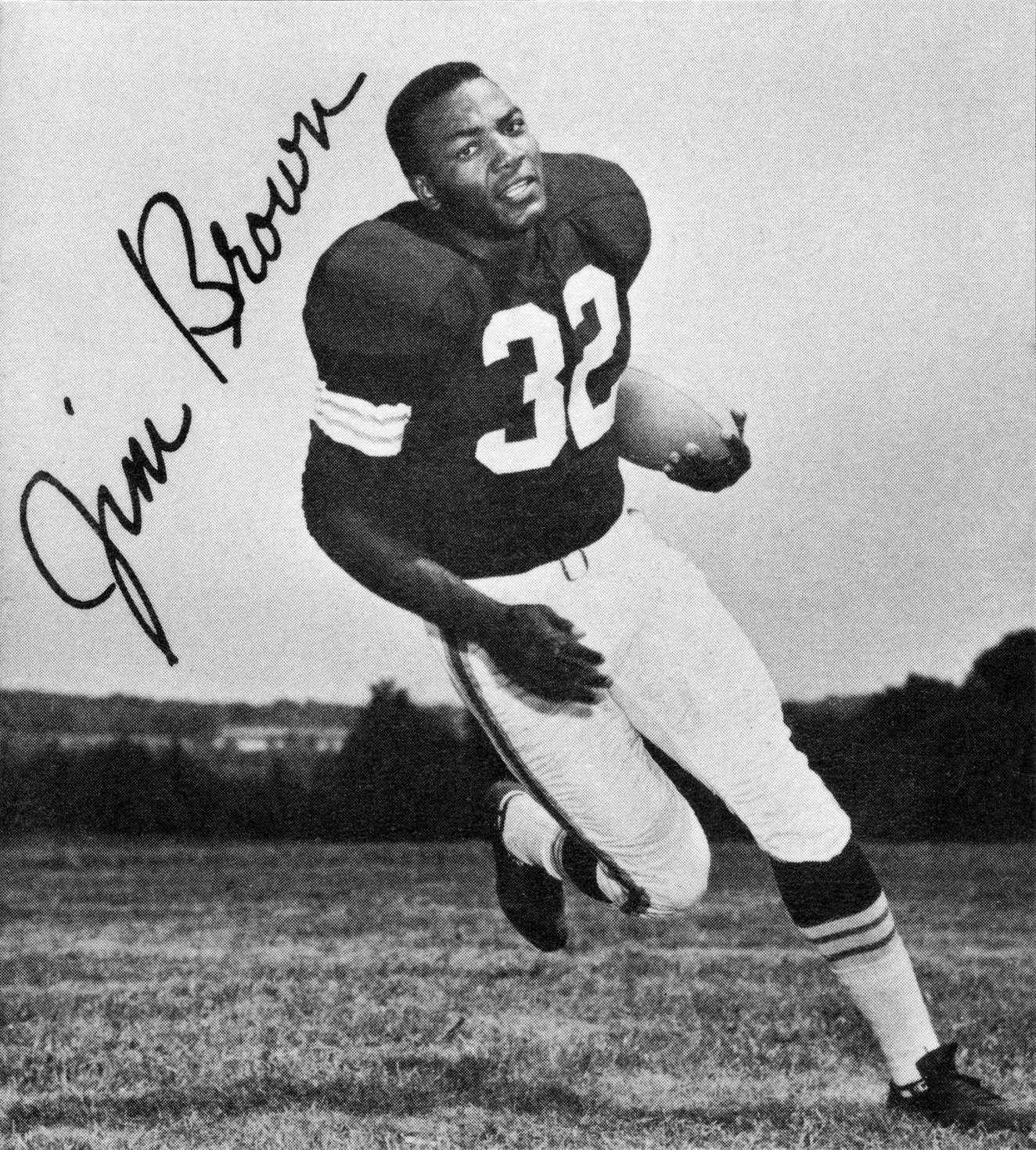
Jim Brown

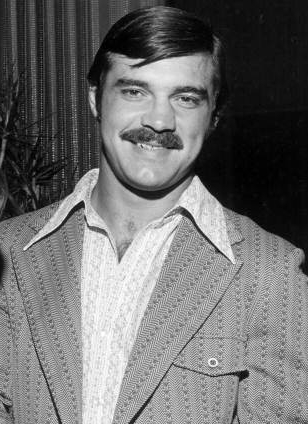
Larry Csonka

==== American football ====
- Doc Alexander – professional football player and coach; College Football Hall of Fame, two-time All American
- Will Allen – professioanl football player with the New York Giants, Miami Dolphins, and New England Patriots.
- Gary Anderson – professional football player with the Pittsburgh Steelers and Minnesota Vikings
- Julie Archoska – professional football player with the Staten Island Stapletons
- Art Baker – professional football player with the Buffalo Bills
- John Barsha – professional football player with the Rochester Jeffersons and the Syracuse Pros
- Mathieu Beaudoin – professional football player with the BC Lions
- Matthew Bergeron – professional football player with the Atlanta Falcons
- Jim Brown – professional football player with the Cleveland Browns; Pro Football Hall of Fame
- Keith Bulluck – professional football player with the Tennessee Titans
- Rob Burnett – professional football player with the Cleveland Browns, Baltimore Ravens, and Miami Dolphins; Super Bowl XXXV champion
- Delone Carter – professional football player with the Indianapolis Colts
- Andre Cisco – professional football player with the New York Jets and Jacksonville Jaguars
- Jim Collins – professional football player with the Los Angeles Rams and San Diego Chargers
- Irv Constantine – professional football player with the Staten Island Stapletons
- Tom Coughlin – head coach for the New York Giants; three-time Super Bowl champion head coach
- Larry Csonka –professional football player with the Miami Dolphins and New York Giants; College Football Hall of Fame; Pro Football Hall of Fame
- Donovin Darius – professional football player with the Jacksonville Jaguars and Miami Dolphins
- Al Davis – principal owner and general manager of the Oakland Raiders
- Ernie Davis – college football player; Heisman Trophy winner
- Riley Dixon – professional football player with the Tampa Bay Buccaneers and New York Giants
- Randy Edsall – college football coach with the University of Connecticut and the University of Maryland
- Joe Ehrmann – professional football player with the Baltimore Colts
- Zaire Franklin – professional football player with the Green Bay Packers
- Dwight Freeney – professional football player with the Indianapolis Colts, Atlanta Falcons, Seattle Seahawks, and Detroit Lions
- Jim Frugone – professional football player with the New York Giants
- Tim Green – professional football player with the Atlanta Falcons
- Morlon Greenwood – professional football player with the Miami Dolphins, Houston Texans, and Omaha Nighthawks
- Marvin Harrison – professional football player with the Indianapolis Colts; Super Bowl XLI champion
- Sterling Hofrichter – professional football player with the Atlanta Falcons, Tampa Bay Buccaneers, and Miami Dolphins
- Qadry Ismail – professional football player with the Miami Dolphins, New Orleans Saints, Baltimore Ravens, and Indianapolis Colts; Super Bowl XXXV champion
- Tanard Jackson – professional football player with the Tampa Bay Buccaneers and Washington Redskins
- Paul Jappe – professional football player with the New York Giants and Brooklyn Lions
- Daryl Johnston – professional football player with the Dallas Cowboys
- Arthur Jones – professional football player with the Baltimore Ravens, Indianapolis Colts, and Washington Redskins; Super Bowl XLVII champion
- Chandler Jones – professional football player with the New England Patriots, Arizona Cardinals, and Las Vegas Raiders
- Tebucky Jones – professional football player with the New England Patriots, Miami Dolphins, and New Orleans Saints; Super Bowl XXXVI champion
- Dwayne Joseph – professional football player with the Chicago Bears; vice president of player personnel for the Detroit Lions
- Bill Kellogg, professional football player with the Frankford Yellow Jackets and Rochester Jeffersons
- Rob Konrad – professional football player with the Miami Dolphins
- Floyd Little – professional football player with the Denver Broncos; Pro Football Hall of Fame; College Football Hall of Fame
- John Mackey – professional football player with the Baltimore Colts and San Diego Chargers; Super Bowl V champion; Pro Football Hall of Fame
- Olindo Mare – professional football player with the Miami Dolphins, New Orleans Saints, Seattle Seahawks, Carolina Panthers and Chicago Bears
- Doug Marrone – professional football player with the Miami Dolphins and New Orleans Saints; head football coach at Syracuse University, Buffalo Bills, and Jacksonville Jaguars
- Frank Matteo – professional football player with the Rochester Jeffersons
- Donovan McNabb – professional football player with the Philadelphia Eagle, Washington Redskins, and Minnesota Vikings
- Don McPherson – professional football player with the Philadelphia Eagles, Houston Oilers, Hamilton Tiger-Cats, and Ottawa Rough Riders; College Football Hall of Fame
- Dave Meggyesy – professional football player with the St. Louis Cardinals
- Ifeatu Melifonwu – professional football player with the Detroit Lions and Tampa Bay Buccaneers
- Art Monk – professional football player with the Washington Redskins, the New York Jets and the Philadelphia Eagles; Pro Football Hall of Fame
- Tim Moresco – professional football player with the Green Bay Packers and New York Jets
- Joe Morris – professional football player with the New York Giants
- Larry Morris – professional football player with the Green Bay Packers
- Tom Myers – professional football player with the New Orleans Saints
- Jim Nance – professional football player with the Boston Patriots
- Ryan Nassib – professional football player with the New York Giants and Jacksonville Jaguars
- Henry Obst – professional football player with the Staten Island Stapletons and Philadelphia Eagles
- Markus Paul – professional football player with the Chicago Bears and Tampa Bay Buccaneers
- Jimmy Ridlon – professional football player with the San Francisco 49ers and Dallas Cowboys; sports painter and sculptor
- Jim Ringo – professional football player with the Green Bay Packers and the Philadelphia Eagles; Pro Football Hall of Fame
- Alton Robinson – professional football player with the Seattle Seahawks
- Gerhard Schwedes – professional football player with the Boston Patriots and New York Titans
- Scott Schwedes – professional football player with the Miami Dolphins and San Diego Chargers
- Sam Sebo – professional football player with the Newark Tornadoes
- Kaseem Sinceno – professional football player with the Philadelphia Eagles and Chicago Bears
- Walt Singer – professional football player with the New York Giants
- Chris Slayton – professional football player with the New York Giants and Atlanta Falcons
- Anthony Smith – professional football player with the Pittsburgh Steelers, Green Bay Packers, St. Louis Rams, Jacksonville Jaguars, and Tennessee Titans; two-time Super Bowl champion
- Walt Sweeney – professional football player with the San Diego Chargers
- Andre Szmyt – placekicker for the Cleveland Browns
- Shamarko Thomas – professional football player with the Pittsburgh Steelers, Buffalo Bills, Indianapolis Colts, Denver Broncos, New York Guardians, and DC Defenders
- David Tyree – professional football player with the New York Giants; Super Bowl XLII champion
- Stan Walters – professional football player with the Cincinnati Bengals and Philadelphia Eagles
- Garrett Williams – professional football player with the Arizona Cardinals
- Otis Wilson – professional football player with the Chicago Bears and the Los Angeles Raiders
- Ray Witter – professional football player with the Rochester Jeffersons

==== Baseball ====
- John Coleman – professional baseball player for the Philadelphia Phillies
- Jonah Goldman – professional baseball player for the Cleveland Indians
- Jim Konstanty – professional baseball player for the Cincinnati Reds, Boston Braves, Philadelphia Phillies, New York Yankees, and St. Louis Cardinals
- Doc Oberlander – professional baseball player for the Cleveland Blues

==== Basketball ====
- Carmelo Anthony – professional basketball player with the Denver Nuggets, New York Knicks, Houston Rockets, and Los Angeles Lakers; NCAA basketball tournament Most Outstanding Player; Olympic Gold Medalist
- Dave Bing – professional basketball player with the Detroit Pistons, NBA Hall of Fame, Collegiate Basketball Hall of Fame, and Mayor of Detroit
- Buddy Boeheim – professional basketball player with the Oklahoma City Blue
- Jim Boeheim – college basketball player and coach with Syracuse University; National Basketball Hall of Fame
- Oshae Brissett – professional basketball player in the Israeli Basketball Premier League, Indiana Pacers, Boston Celtics, and Philadelphia 76ers
- Michael Carter-Williams – professional basketball player with the Philadelphia 76ers, Milwaukee Bucks, Chicago Bulls, Charlotte Hornets, Houston Rockets, and Orlando Magic
- Rakeem Christmas – professional basketball player with the Amartha Hangtuah and Fort Wayne Mad Ants
- DaJuan Coleman – professional basketball player with the KK Zlatorog Laško
- Derrick Coleman – professional basketball player with the New Jersey Nets
- Trevor Cooney – professional basketball player with the Leyma Coruña
- Sherman Douglas – professional basketball player with the Miami Heat, Boston Celtics, Milwaukee Bucks, New Jersey Nets, and Los Angeles Clippers
- Dennis DuVal – professional basketball player with the Washington Bullets
- Tyler Ennis – professional basketball player with Hapoel Tel Aviv, formerly in the NBA
- Jonny Flynn – professional basketball player with the Orlandina Basket
- Greg Paulus – head coach of the Niagara Purple Eagles men's basketball team
- Michael Gbinije – professional basketball player with the Cape Town Tigers and Detroit Pistons
- Jerami Grant – professional basketball player with the Portland Trail Blazers, Memphis Grizzlies, Oklahoma City Thunder, Denver Nuggets, and Detroit Pistons; gold medal with the 2020 U.S. Olympic team
- Donté Greene – professional basketball player with the Sacramento Kings
- Jason Hart – professional basketball player and assistant coach for the University of Kentucky
- Wesley Johnson – professional basketball player with the Minnesota Timberwolves, Los Angeles Lakers, and Los Angeles Clippers
- Kris Joseph – college and professional basketball player
- Tyler Lydon – college and professional basketball player
- Chris McCullough – professional basketball player with the Vaqueros de Bayamón
- Gerry McNamara – professional basketball player and head basketball coach at Syracuse University
- Fab Melo – professional basketball player with the Boston Celtics, Liga Sorocabana, and Brasília
- Eddie Miller – professional basketball player with the Milwaukee Hawks and Baltimore Bullets
- Lawrence Moten – professional basketball player with the Vancouver Grizzlies, Washington Wizards, and Maryland Nighthawks
- Louis Orr – professional basketball player with the Indiana Pacers and New York Knicks; head basketball coach at Bowling Green State University and Seton Hall University
- Billy Owens – professional basketball player with the Golden State Warriors, Miami Heat, Sacramento Kings, and Philadelphia 76ers
- Andy Rautins – professional basketball player with the New York Knicks; coach of the Canadian national basketball team
- Malachi Richardson – professional basketball player with the Astros de Jalisco
- Danny Schayes – professional basketball player with the Utah Jazz, Denver Nuggets, Milwaukee Bucks, and Orlando Magic
- Rony Seikaly – professional basketball player with the Miami Heat, Golden State Warriors, Orlando Magic, and New Jersey Nets
- Etan Thomas – professional basketball player with the Washington Wizards, Oklahoma City Thunder, and Atlanta Hawks
- Dion Waiters – professional basketball player with the Cleveland Cavaliers, Oklahoma City Thunder, Miami Heat, and Los Angeles Lakers
- John Wallace – professional basketball player with the New York Knicks, Toronto Raptors, Detroit Pistons, and Phoenix Suns
- Hakim Warrick – professional basketball player with the Memphis Grizzlies, Chicago Bulls, Phoenix Suns, New Orleans Hornets, and Charlotte Bobcats
- Dwayne Washington – professional basketball player with the New Jersey Nets
- Howard Washington – professional basketball player with the Buffalo eXtreme

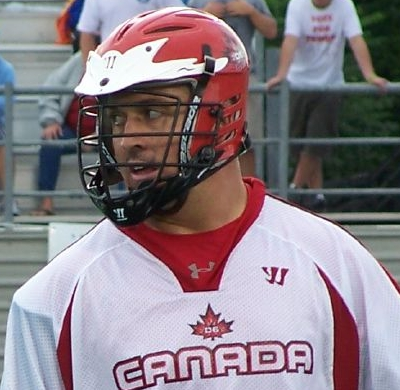
Gary Gait

==== Lacrosse ====
- John Desko – lacrosse head coach at Syracuse University
- Gary Gait – professional lacrosse player, head coach of the men's lacrosse at Syracuse University; Canadian Lacrosse Hall of Fame
- Paul Gait – professional lacrosse player and coach
- Casey Powell – professional lacrosse player
- Mikey Powell – college All-American lacrosse player and professional lacrosse player
- Ryan Powell – four-time All-American lacrosse player at Syracuse University
- Victor Ross – college All-American lacrosse player and professional lacrosse player

==== Soccer ====
- Abdi Salim – professional footballer
- Paul Young – professional footballer and coach

==== Track and field ====
- Colin Bennie, distance runner
- Marty Glickman (1936–1939) – football All-American, Olympic sprinter
- Martin Hehir – distance runner
- Myer Prinstein – Olympic track medalist
- Kathrine Switzer – marathon runner
- Anthony Washington – discus thrower, three-time Olympian
- Joe Whelan – distance runner
- Paige Wood - distance runner
- Katie Zaferes – triathlete; silver and bronze medal for the United States in the 2020 Tokyo Olympic triathlon

==== Wrestling and MMA ====
- Mark Kerr – NCAA Wrestling Champion; retired MMA fighter; two-time Ultimate Fighting Championship Heavyweight Tournament winner
- Mike Rotunda – professional wrestler

==== Other sports ====
- Nathan Bombrys – CEO of Rugby Canada
- Greg Sankey – commissioner of the Southeastern Conference

=== Other professions ===
- Neilia Hunter Biden – teacher, first wife of Joe Biden

=== Fictional alumni ===
- Jeff Bingham – protagonist of sitcom Rules of Engagement
- Winston Bishop – protagonist of sitcom New Girl
- Rachel Green – protagonist of sitcom Friends
- Terry Jeffords – revealed on Brooklyn Nine-Nine to have played football while attending Syracuse University
- Nick Miller – protagonist of sitcom New Girl
- Winston Schmidt – protagonist of sitcom New Girl

== Benefactors ==
- John Dustin Archbold – businessman and oil refiner
- Andrew Carnegie – industrialist and philanthropist
- George F. Comstock – lawyer and politician
- Joseph Lubin – accountant and businessman
- Donald Newhouse – businessman and philanthropist
- Samuel Irving Newhouse, Jr. – businessman and philanthropist
- Samuel Irving Newhouse, Sr. – businessman and publisher
- Eliphalet Remington – engineer who founded what would become known as Remington Arms
- Margaret Olivia Slocum Sage – philanthropist known for her contributions to education and progressive causes
- Lyman Cornelius Smith – innovator and industrialist
- Thomas J. Watson – businessman who was the chairman and CEO of IBM
- Martin J. Whitman – investment adviser and namesake of Martin J. Whitman School of Management

== Commencement speakers and honored guests ==
- 2022 – David Muir, journalist and the anchor of ABC World News Tonight
- 2020 – Kathy Hochul, congresswoman from New York, Governor of New York State ('80)
- 2018 – Mary C. Daly, economist and president of San Francisco Fed
- 2018 – Kathrine Switzer, athlete, author and activist ('68, G'72)
- 2017 – Vernon Jordan, lawyer, business executive, and civil rights activist
- 2016 – Donald Newhouse, president, Advance Publications
- 2015 – Mary Karr, poet and essayist
- 2014 – David Remnick, editor-in-chief, New Yorker
- 2013 – Nicholas Kristof, New York Times columnist
- 2012 − Aaron Sorkin, screenwriter, producer, and playwright
- 2011 – J. Craig Venter, biologist and entrepreneur, president of J. Craig Venter Institute
- 2010 – Jamie Dimon, CEO of JPMorgan Chase & Co.
- 2009 – Joseph R. Biden Jr., vice president of the US
- 2008 – Bob Woodruff, ABC News journalist
- 2007 – Frank McCourt, author, Pulitzer Prize winner
- 2006 – Billy Joel, composer and singer
- 2005 – Jane Goodall, primatologist, ethologist and anthropologist
- 2004 – Phylicia Rashad, actress
- 2003 – Bill Clinton, U.S. president, 1993–2001
- 2002 – Rudolph Giuliani, mayor of New York City, 1994–2001
- 2001 – Eileen Collins, astronaut
- 2000 – Ted Koppel, journalist
- 1999 – Charles Schumer, U.S. senator (D-NY), 1999–present
- 1998 – Robert Fulghum, author, essayist
- 1996 – Steve Kroft, journalist, long-time correspondent, 60 Minutes
- 1995 – Donna Shalala, secretary of Health and Human Services, 1993–2001
- 1994 – Kurt Vonnegut, novelist
- 1990 – William Safire, journalist
- 1989 – Daniel Patrick Moynihan, U.S. senator (D-NY)
- 1988 – Malcolm Forbes, publisher of Forbes
- 1986 – Mario Cuomo, governor of New York
- 1983 – Daniel Boorstin, director, Library of Congress
- 1982 – Ted Koppel, journalist
- 1981 – Alexander Haig, U.S. secretary of state, 1981–1982
- 1980 – Bill Moyers, journalist
- 1979 – Tom Brokaw, journalist
- 1978 – William Safire, journalist
- 1973 – Edward M. Kennedy, U.S. senator (D-MA), 1962–2009
- 1969 – William F. Buckley, journalist
- 1968 – Walter Cronkite, journalist
- 1966 – Nelson Rockefeller, governor of New York, 1959–1973
- 1965 – Robert F. Kennedy, U.S. senator (D-NY), 1965–1968
- 1964 – Lyndon B. Johnson, then U.S. president
- 1961 – Ayn Rand, novelist
- 1960 – Harry S. Truman, U.S. president, 1945–1953
- 1959 – Robert Frost, poet
- 1957 – John F. Kennedy, U.S. senator (D-MA), 1953–1960
- 1937 – Herbert Hoover, U.S. president, 1929–1933
- 1930 – Franklin D. Roosevelt, governor of New York, 1928–1932

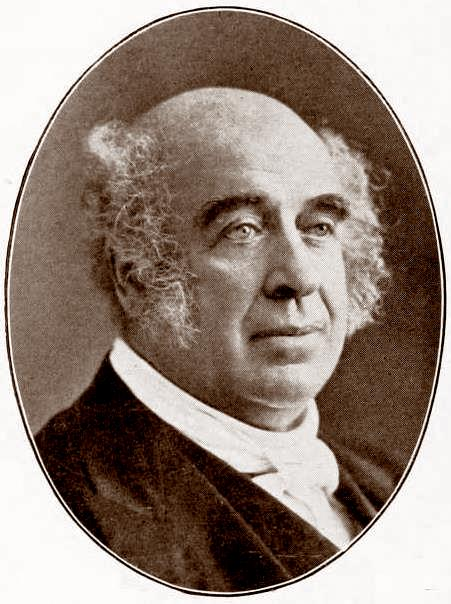
Jesse Truesdell Peck

== Founders ==
- Daniel Steele – Methodist systematic theologian, evangelist, and writer
- Charles Andrews – lawyer and politician
- George F. Comstock – lawyer and politician
- Jesse Truesdell Peck – bishop of the Methodist Episcopal Church; first chairman of the university's board of trustees
- George L. Taylor – physician and politician

== Faculty ==
- William Alston – philosopher
- Julia Alvarez – poet, novelist, and essayist
- Richard Arnowitt – theoretical physicist
- Donna Arzt – attorney and legal scholar
- Abhay Ashtekar – theoretical physicist and creator of the Ashtekar variables for quantum gravity; member of the U.S. National Academy of Sciences
- Ernst Bacon – prolific composer
- A. P. Balachandran – theoretical particle physicist
- Peter Bergmann – won the Einstein Prize for research on quantum gravity
- Catherine Bertini – United Nations under-secretary-general, winner of the 2003 World Food Prize
- Raymond Thayer Birge – physicist, president of the American Physical Society and chair of the University of California, Berkeley physics department
- Howard Boatwright – Music School dean
- Philip Booth – poet
- Mark Bowick – theoretical physicist noted for work in particle physics and condensed matter physics
- Zachary Braiterman – philosopher and religious studies scholar
- Arthur C. Brooks
- Lori Brown – architect and associate professor
- Horace Campbell – Department of African American Studies and Department of Political Science
- Raymond Carver – short story writer
- Simon Catterall – theoretical physicist specializing in elementary particles
- Bill Cole – musician, author (Department of African American Studies)
- David Crane – chief prosecutor for the Special Court of Sierra Leone
- Teresa Abi-Nader Dahlberg – academic administrator and engineering professor
- Junot Díaz – writer
- Ismail al-Faruqi – philosopher and Islamic scholar
- Geoffrey C. Fox – theoretical physicist and computer scientist
- Tess Gallagher – poet, essayist, short story writer
- Joshua N. Goldberg – theoretical physicist noted for work on general relativity
- Arnold P. Goldstein – psychologist noted for work on anger replacement
- John Langston Gwaltney – professor of anthropology, author of Drylongso: A Self Portrait of Black America
- Per Brinch Hansen – computer scientist
- Douglas Holtz-Eakin – director of the U.S. Congressional Budget Office (2003–2005), and chief economic policy adviser to U.S. Senator John McCain's 2008 presidential campaign
- Henry Kandrup – theoretical astrophysicist
- Mary Karr – writer and poet
- Bruce Kingma – economist and academic entrepreneur
- Arthur Komar – theoretical physicist
- Louis Krasner – violinist
- Edgar Lane – professor of political science
- Melvin Lax – theoretical physicist and member of the National Academy of Sciences
- Cristina Marchetti – theoretical physicist specializing in soft condensed matter physics; member of the U.S. National Academy of Sciences
- Donald Marolf – theoretical physicist who has worked on quantum gravity and relativity
- Roscoe C. Martin (1903–1972) – professor of Political Science at Syracuse University 1949–1972
- Janis Mayes – author, literary critic
- Ivan Meštrović – sculptor and artist
- Daniel Patrick Moynihan – senator from New York, political scientist
- Micere Mugo – poet and playwright (Department of African American Studies, Department of Literature)
- Ei-ichi Negishi – chemist, winner of the 2010 Nobel Prize
- Romita Ray – art historian
- Fritz Rohrlich – theoretical physicist, pioneer of quantum electrodynamics
- Alexander Rosenberg – philosopher and novelist
- Peter Saulson – experimental physicist noted for work on gravitational wave astronomy
- George Saunders – writer
- Delmore Schwartz – poet
- Harry Schwartz – Soviet specialist, The New York Times editorial writer
- Milton Sernett – historian, author (Department of African American Studies, Department of History)
- James Roger Sharp – political historian
- Huston Smith – religious studies scholar
- Lee Smolin – theoretical physicist noted for work on quantum gravity
- Rafael Sorkin – theoretical physicist noted for work on quantum gravity
- Sheldon Stone – elementary particle physicist, winner of the Panofsky Prize
- Eileen Strempel – soprano, associate dean of Graduate Studies, associate professor of Fine Arts
- George Sudarshan – theoretical physicist, winner of the Dirac Prize
- Robert Thompson – media historian
- Mark Trodden – theoretical cosmologist
- Douglas Unger – novelist
- Gabriel Vahanian – theologian, noted figure in the Death of God movement in the 1960s
- Peter Van Inwagen – philosopher
- Kameshwar C. Wali – theoretical physicist, author
- Johan Wiklund – entrepreneurship professor and the Al Berg Chair at the Whitman School
- Frances Willard – 19th-century educator, temperance reformer, and women's suffragist
- Tobias Wolff – writer
- Ivor Wynne – director of athletics at McMaster University
