= Vannicola =

Vannicola is a surname. Notable people with the surname include:

- Jo Vannicola (born 1968), a.k.a. Joanne Vannicola, Canadian actor
- Vincenzo C. Vannicola (1932–2026), American electrical engineer
