= Alopex =

Alopex may refer to:

- Alopex lagopus, a taxonomic synonym for the Arctic fox, Vulpes lagopus
- ALOPEX a correlation-based machine learning algorithm
- Alopex (Teenage Mutant Ninja Turtles), a character in the Teenage Mutant Ninja Turtles franchise
- Alopex (Ancient Greek: ἀλώπηξ) ancient Greek for fox
- Alopex, the stage name for a Wellington, NZ based DJ specializing in progressive house
