= Rubin Braunstein =

American physicist and educator (1922–2018)

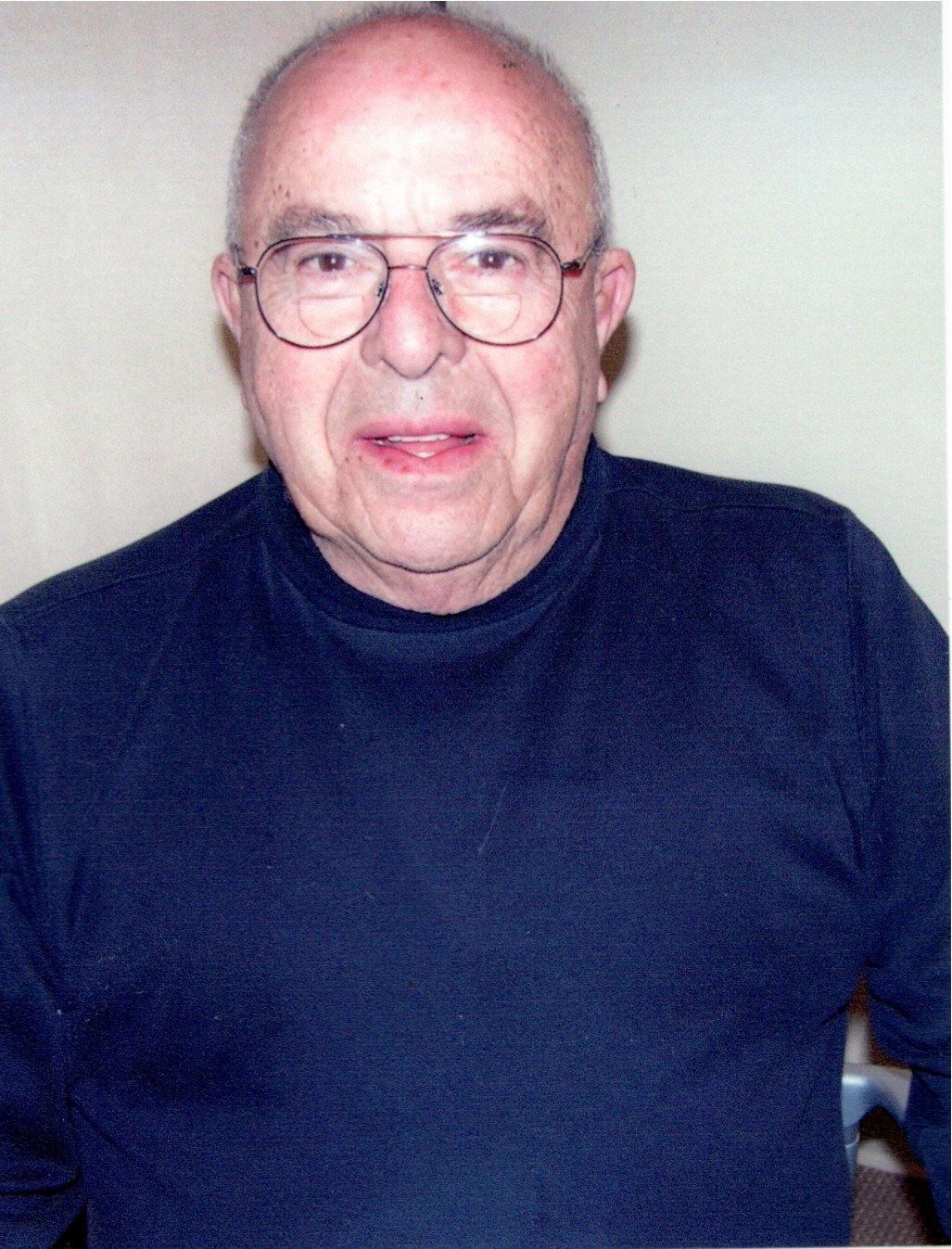
- Prof. Rubin Braunstein UCLA Emeritus
- Born: May 6, 1922; New York, USA
- Died: June 9, 2018 (aged 96); California, USA
- Education: Syracuse University, Ph.D. (1954)
- Spouse: Jacqueline Braunstein
- Scientific career
- Fields: semiconductor physics, optics
- Institutions: RCA Laboratory, UCLA
- Doctoral advisor: John Trischka

Rubin Braunstein (1922–2018) was an American physicist and educator. In 1955 he published the first measurements of light emission by semiconductor diodes made from crystals of gallium arsenide (GaAs), gallium antimonide (GaSb), and indium phosphide (InP). GaAs, GaSb, and InP are examples of III-V semiconductors. The III-V semiconductors absorb and emit light much more strongly than silicon, which is the best-known semiconductor. Braunstein's devices are the forerunners of contemporary LED lighting and semiconductor lasers, which typically employ III-V semiconductors. The 2000 and 2014 Nobel Prizes in Physics were awarded for further advances in closely related fields.

== Early life and education ==
Braunstein was raised in New York City. He earned a doctorate in physics from Syracuse University in 1954.

== Career ==
After university, he joined the research laboratory of the RCA Corporation, which was among the most active industrial laboratories at the time. In the following decade at RCA Laboratories he published broadly on semiconductor physics and technology. Beyond his seminal work with light emission from III-V semiconductors, in 1964 he exploited newly invented lasers to publish the first paper on two-photon absorption in semiconductors. Typically, only individual photons (particles of light) with some minimum energy are absorbed by a given semiconductor. For very high intensity beams of light, two photons, each with half that minimum energy, can be absorbed simultaneously. He also published highly cited foundation papers on the electronic, optical, and vibrational properties of III-V semiconductors, silicon, and germanium.

In 1964 Braunstein became a professor of physics at University of California, Los Angeles (UCLA), where he remained for the rest of his career. His research there continued his RCA work with optoelectronic properties of semiconductors as well as contributions related to the optical properties of highly transparent materials such as tungstate glasses. Some of Braunstein's work was theoretical, including the proposal that neutral atoms could be scattered by a sufficiently intense standing wave of light. Since light is an electromagnetic wave, it had long been known that charged particles like electrons would be scattered. The effect with neutral atoms is much weaker, but was finally observed nearly 20 years after the proposal of Braunstein and his co-authors.

Braunstein was selected as a Fellow of the American Physical Society in 1964.

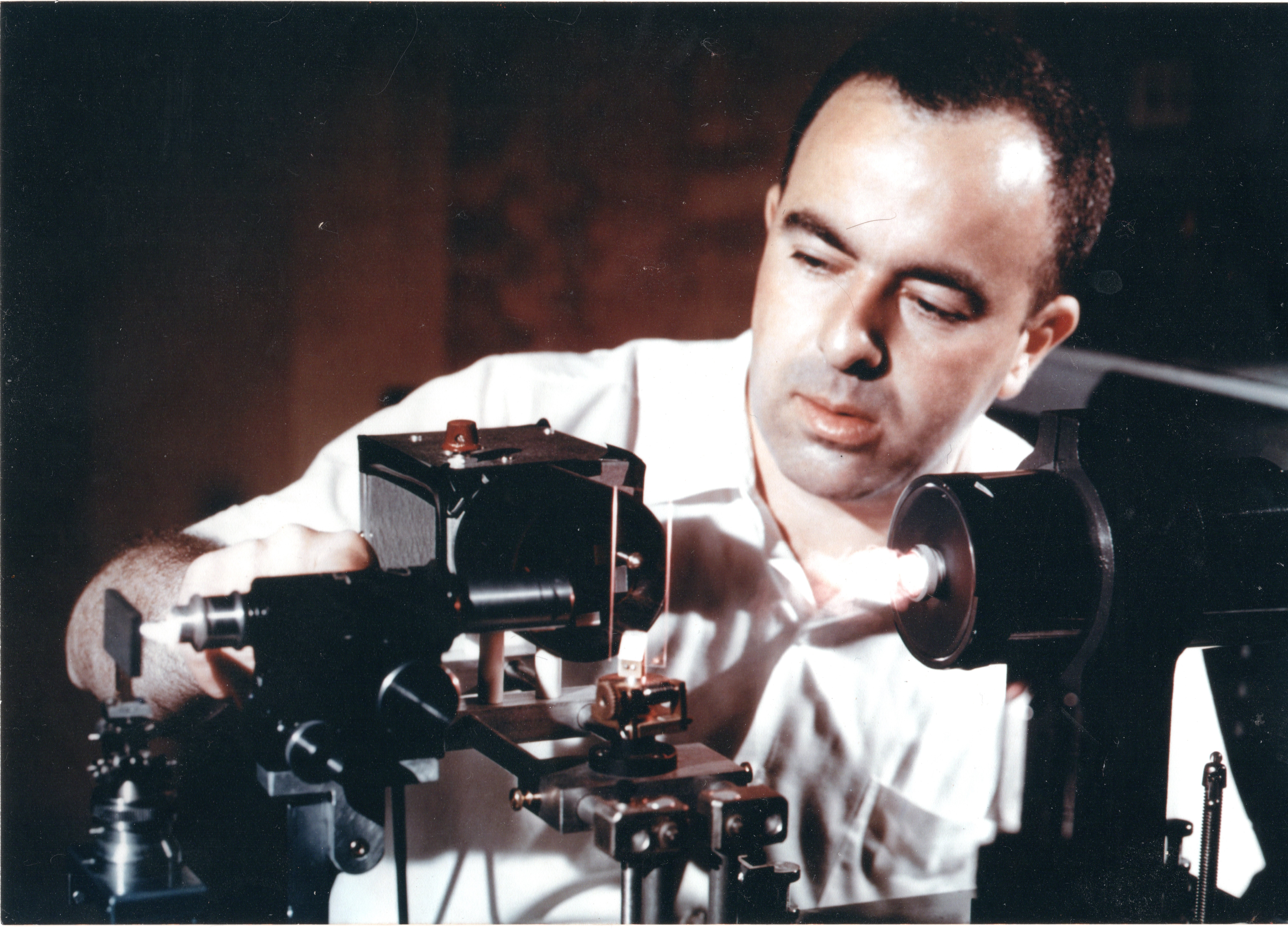

== See also ==
- Light-emitting diode#History
- List of Syracuse University people
