= Jeffrey H. Winicour =

American physicist

- Education: Massachusetts Institute of Technology
- Known for: General relativity, Gravitational radiation
- Awards: American Physical Society Fellow (2003)
- Scientific career
- Fields: Theoretical physics
- Workplaces: University of Pittsburgh
- Doctoral advisor: Peter Bergmann
- Doctoral students: Luis Lehner
- Website: www.physicsandastronomy.pitt.edu/people/jeffrey-winicour

Jeffrey H. Winicour is an American physicist and professor at the University of Pittsburgh, who specialized in the theory of relativity. Winicour's 1964 PhD dissertation was an "investigation of the gravitational coupling of radiation fields in the framework of the general theory of relativity." Winicour was the advisor to Luis Lehner, who received the 1999 Nicholas Metropolis Award from the American Physical Society. The award credited Lehner and Winicour, as advisor, for "developing a method that significantly advances the capability for modeling gravitational radiation by making possible the stable numerical solution of Einstein's equation near moving black holes."

== Research ==
Winicour's work emphasizes characteristic evolution methods for solving Einstein's field equations, particularly for gravitational waveforms from binary black hole systems. He developed techniques combining interior Cauchy evolution with exterior characteristic evolution to null infinity, applicable to various hyperbolic systems in astrophysics and beyond. A key accomplishment includes creating a characteristic wave extraction tool integrated into the Einstein Toolkit, widely used in numerical relativity. He has collaborated internationally on stable solutions to Einstein's equations near black holes and extended his methods to other wave systems, such as seismic or electromagnetic waves.

== Research impact ==
Winicour's publications have received over 6,600 citations. Notable works include "Reality of the Schwarzschild Singularity" (1968, 444 citations) and "Characteristic Evolution and Matching" (2012). His mentorship influenced researchers like Luis Lehner, who won the 1999 Nicholas Metropolis Award for work co-developed with Winicour on modeling gravitational radiation near black holes. His research has been funded by multiple National Science Foundation (NSF) grants, including PHY-1505965 for gravitational radiation from black holes, as well as PHY-0854623, PHY-0553597, PHY-0245368, and PHY-9800731.

== Awards and honors ==
Elected Fellow of the American Physical Society (2003) for contributions to general relativity. Shared credit in the 1999 Nicholas Metropolis Award (awarded to advisee Luis Lehner) for developing methods to model gravitational radiation near black holes.

== Selected publications ==
His most cited papers are

- Janis AI, Newman ET, Winicour J. Reality of the Schwarzschild singularity. Physical Review Letters. 1968 Apr 15;20(16):878. Cited 444 times according to Google Scholar
- LA Tamburino LA, Winicour JH. Gravitational fields in finite and conformal Bondi frames. Physical Review. 1966 Oct 28;150(4):1039. Cited 255 times according to Google Scholar *
- Winicour J. Characteristic evolution and matching. Living reviews in relativity. 2012 Dec;15(1):1-99. Cited 38 times according to Google Scholar
- Bishop NT, Gómez R, Lehner L, Maharaj M, Winicour J. High-powered gravitational news. Physical Review D. 1997 Nov 15;56(10):6298. Cited 160 times according to Google Scholar
