= Pantur Silaban =

Indonesian physicist (1937–2022)

- Born: 11 November 1937; Sidikalang, Dairi, Dutch East Indies
- Died: 1 August 2022 (aged 84); Bandung, West Java, Indonesia
- Education: Bandung Institute of Technology; Syracuse University
- Known for: Theory of General Relativity
- Spouse: Rugun br. Lumbantoruan
- Children: Anna; Ruth; Sarah; Mary
- Scientific career
- Fields: Physics, theory of relativity, quantum theory
- Workplaces: Bandung Institute of Technology
- Thesis: Null Tetrad, Formulation of the Equation of Motion in General Relativity (1971)
- Doctoral advisor: Peter G. Bergmann

Pantur Silaban (11 November 1937 – 1 August 2022) was an Indonesian physicist, regarded as one of the foremost in his profession in Indonesia, especially in the field of theoretical physics. He was also one of the earliest physicists from ASEAN countries who studied Einstein's general relativity theories in depth.

== Early life ==
Pantur Silaban was born in Sumatra to Israel Silaban and Regina Lumbantoruan in Dairi Regency in Sumatra, Indonesia.

He finished his bachelor's degree in physics from Bandung Institute of Technology, Indonesia in 1964.

== Career ==
In 1967, Silaban went to the United States to study General Relativity theory at Central Studies of Gravitation at Syracuse University under the direction of Peter Bergmann and Joshua N. Goldberg who were among the authoritative experts in general relativity after Albert Einstein. Here, Silaban went further to study one of the hottest topics in physics at the time which tried to unify quantum field and general relativity to find quantum gravity theory. It is one of Einstein's dreams which had tried but failed to formalize the fourth interaction in the universe into one single theory called Grand Unified Theory.

Instead of insisting on working on quantum gravity, Silaban eventually followed the advice of Goldberg to change the subject for his dissertation: to amputate the principle of General Relativity using the Poincare Group to find a physical quantity that is conserved in gravitational radiation. These findings confirmed the Big Bang as a model for the formation of the Universe rather than the other models. Silaban finished his dissertation with the title "Null Tetrad, Formulation of the Equation of Motion in General Relativity" in 1971.

Three years later Joshua Goldberg – who produces many important physics treatises published in major journals such as Physical Review D, Journal of Mathematical Physics, and Journal of Geometrical Physics – referred to Silaban's work in his paper, Conservation Equations and Equations of Motion in the Null Formalism.

A year after completing his dissertation, Silaban went back to Bandung in 1972 and taught at the Department of Physics, Bandung Institute of Technology. Silaban was the first Indonesian scientist who studied General Relativity to a doctoral level. Besides general relativity, he also studied Particle physics.

Silaban became a full professor at ITB in 1995. Less than a month after Bergmann died, Silaban retired from ITB in November 2002 at the age of 65. For his contribution to science, especially physics, Freedom Institute – Center of Democracy, Nationalism, and Market Economy Studies awarded him the Achmad Bakrie Award in 2009.
