= Yude Pan =

American forest ecologist

- Education: Ph.D SUNY-ESF at Syracuse University M.Sc. Graduate School of Chinese Academy of Sciences B.S. Oceanography University of China
- Occupations: Senior researcher at the USDA Forest Service with the Fire, Climate, and Carbon Cycle Sciences group of the Northern Research Station

Yude Pan is a senior research scientist with the Climate, Fire, and Carbon Cycle Sciences group of the Northern Research Station, USDA Forest Service, and a senior investigator of the Harvard Forest at Harvard University. Her work is in the fields of Ecosystem ecology and Global Change Biology. She studies terrestrial ecosystems and how environmental stressors affect complex interactions within those ecosystems. Much of her research focuses on forest ecosystems and how they relate to the carbon cycle as a whole, as well as forecasting complex effects of land use, climate change and air pollution on forest ecosystems.

== Education ==
Pan received a B.S. from the Oceanography University of China in applied mathematics in 1983. She then went on to receive a Master of Science in Quantitative Plant Ecology from the Graduate School of the Chinese Academy of Sciences in 1985. She completed her PhD in Plant Ecology at SUNY-ESF at Syracuse University in 1993.

== Career and research ==
Pan is currently a senior researcher at the USDA Forest Service with the Fire, Climate, and Carbon Cycle Sciences group of the Northern research station. She is also a senior investigator of Harvard Forest at Harvard University. She is a member of the U.S. Government's Carbon Cycle Science Steering Group which is a group of experts involved in carbon cycle research and application from federal, state, university, and non-government organizations. She is also a member of the Global Forest Expert Panel (GFEP) on Biodiversity, Forest Management and REDD+ and a member of the CPF (The Collaborative Partnership on Forests) of the United Nations. She is also a member of the editorial boards of the ESA journals, Ecosphere and Ecological Applications, as well as associate editor of the Journal of Geophysical Research - Biogeosciences.

She was an Associate Faculty Member at the University of Pennsylvania in the Department of Earth Environmental Science from 2005 to 2016. From 2007 to 2008 she was also a visiting research scholar at Princeton University in the Department of Ecology and Evolutionary Biology. From 1994 to 1997 she was a Postdoc and research associate at the Ecosystems Center, Marine Biological Laboratory in Woods Hole, MA.

Pan is known for his interdisciplinary research in terrestrial ecosystems. She has been part of many projects that look at the impacts of climate change on forest ecosystems and how forests may function as a buffer for climate change. She also studies how land use change, climate and air pollution affect forester watersheds on multiple scales. Her best known findings, that have been cited over 4,000 times, are from a paper titled “‘A Large and Persistent Carbon Sink in the World’s Forests”. While it has long been understood that forests are a large terrestrial carbon sink, this study found that “global forests have annually removed 2.4 billion tons of carbon which absorbs 8.8 billion tons of carbon dioxide from the atmosphere, about one-third of fossil fuel emissions annually for the period of 1990-2007.” This study also emphasizes the importance of not passively relying on forests to absorb about ⅓ of fossil fuel emissions annually because current trends in forest treatment like deforestation and fires decrease forests ability to absorb carbon dioxide.

== Awards and honors ==
Pan was elected as an ESA (The Ecological Society of America) fellow in 2020 for her contributions to the science of ecology. In 2016 she was awarded the Chief's Distinguished Science Award from the USDA Forest Service and the Charles Bullard Fellowship at Harvard Forest from Harvard University. She was also awarded the Director's Distinguished Science Award from the Northern Research Station at the USDA Forest Service in 2015. In 2011 she was given the Awards of Merit for Leading the publication of the US Agricultural Department from the USDA. She was also awarded the International Forestry Award from the USDA Forest Service in 2002.

Pan's research has been funded by NASA (some of those publications cited here) and by USFS Climate Change Research Grants.

== Selected publications ==
- "A Large and Persistent Carbon Sink in the World’s Forests”, 2011, Science
- “The Structure, Distribution, and Biomass of the World's Forests”, 2013, Annual Review of Ecology, Evolution, and Systematics
- “Tree mortality from drought, insects, and their interactions in a changing climate”, 2015, New Phytol
- “Age structure and disturbance legacy of North American forests”, 2011, Biogeosciences
- “Increasing Net Primary Production in China from 1982 to 1999”, 2003, Frontiers in Ecology and the Environment
