= Clifton E. Marsh =

American historian

Dr. Clifton E. Marsh (born August 10, 1946 ) is an American author, sociologist and educator. He has written a number of books that chronicle the history of various people of the African Diaspora.

Dr. Marsh is best known for his examination of the Nation of Islam in The Lost-Found Nation of Islam in America (Scarecrow Press, Inc. 1996). The book follows in the tradition of C. Eric Lincoln's The Black Muslims in America which first introduced the Nation of Islam, Elijah Muhammad and Malcolm X into the American consciousness. The Lost-Found Nation of Islam in America spans the history of the organization, while also covering its most recent milestones and benchmarks such as the emergence of Louis Farrakhan as a world leader; the International Saviours' Day Conference of 1994 in Accra, Ghana, and the Million Man March in 1995.

Dr. Marsh is also author to Journey to Shanara: a Love Story and a Proposal to Freedom, a book of poetry which was reviewed as "an exciting volume of personal, racial, Black nationalist, American, universal, and interplanetary poetry" by the Los Angeles Sentinel in their August 22, 1974 edition. The book explores the Black experience, including aspects of the Black nationalist movements and the social contentions which resulted in these movements. In addition to this, main topics in the work include the celebration of "music, love, and women." This work is further described by the newspaper as an example of "New Black Poetry", as Marsh writes in polyrhythmic free verse similar to rapping which purposefully ignores the conventions of formal English.

== Biography ==
A native of Los Angeles, California, Dr. Marsh was an all conference football player at California State University, Long Beach. He went on to earn a Ph.D. in Sociology at Syracuse University. He is currently a professor of Social and Public Services at Tidewater Community College in Norfolk, Virginia. His past academic posts have included Chairman of the Social Science department at Morris Brown College in Atlanta and the department of Sociology at Hampton University in Virginia.

== Works ==
- The Lost-Found Nation of Islam in America, (Scarecrow Press 1996, 2000)
- Harford County, Maryland Homeless and Shelter Survey: Housing and Shelter in a Community in Transition, (University Press of America 1995)
- From Black Muslims to Muslims: The Transition from Separatism to Islam, 1930-1980, (Scarecrow Press 1984)
- Danish Virgin Islands: a History, (Wyndham Hall Press 1985)
- A Socio-Historical Analysis of the Emancipation of 1848 and the Labor Revolt of 1878 in the Danish Virgin Islands, (Caribbean Research Institute 1981)
- Summer 72, (Shanara Publications 1976)
- Journey to Shanara: a Love Story and a Proposal to Freedom (Shanara Publications 1974)
