= Deborah VanAmerongen =

American politician

Deborah VanAmerongen joined Nixon Peabody as a strategic policy adviser in February 2010. She works closely with attorneys in the firm's Affordable Housing practice to provide advice to developers, owners, and managers of affordable housing, as well as their financing partners, in the preservation and production of affordable housing nationwide.

VanAmerongen was appointed to serve as the 17th Commissioner of the New York State Division of Housing and Community Renewal (DHCR) in February 2007.

== Life ==
VanAmerongen graduated from Utica College of Syracuse University and received her M.A. in Public Administration from Rockefeller College of the State University of New York at Albany. She began her career in public service in the New York State Assembly's Program & Counsel staff, where she had oversight of a wide range of issues, including Housing, Consumer Affairs, Agriculture and Veterans Affairs.

VanAmerongen left the NYS Assembly to accept an appointment as Director of Multifamily Housing for the Department of Housing and Urban Development (HUD) in the New York City region. During her tenure at HUD, she was responsible for more than 1,300 federally assisted multifamily developments in and around New York City.

When she was appointed Commissioner of DHCR, Ms VanAmerongen made a priority of increasing coordination and collaboration with other state agencies and private sector partners, in an effort to increase her agency's effectiveness and maximize the impact of limited resources. She also enhanced DHCR's operations by increasing the use of technology throughout the agency.

VanAmerongen also chaired the Housing Trust Fund Corporation, which provides loans and grants for the rehabilitation and construction of affordable housing under a number of federal and State programs.

Additionally, VanAmerongen served as chair of the Roosevelt Island Operating Corporation, and was a member of the Board of Directors of the NYS Housing Finance Agency; the State of New York Mortgage Agency; the Homeless Housing Assistance Corporation, the Harlem Community Development Corporation and the New York State Affordable Housing Corporation

She resigned effective 1/15/2010. http://www.state.ny.us/governor/press/press_12300901.html%5B%5D
