= Lori Weitzner =

American textile and product designer

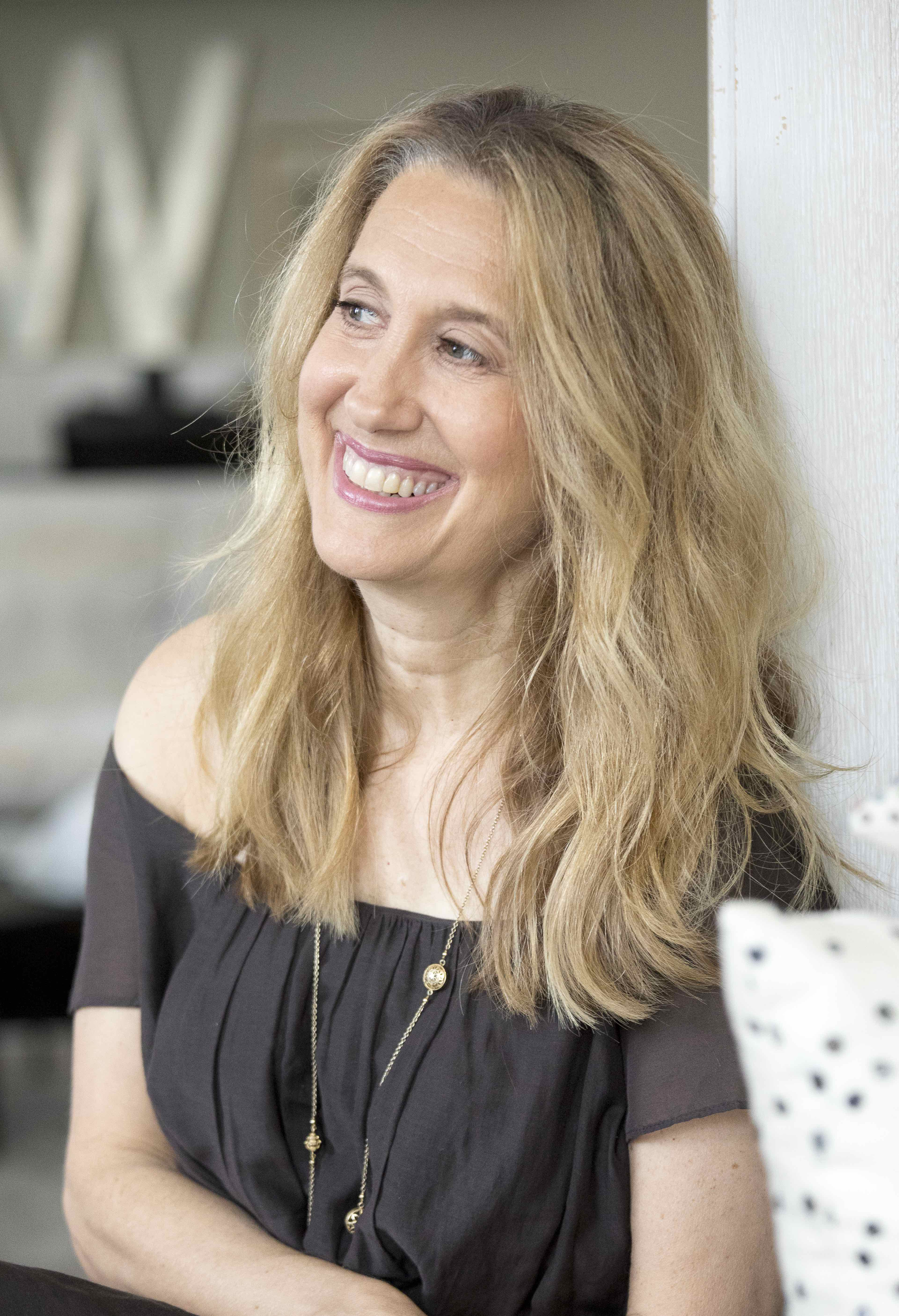
- Education: Syracuse University
- Occupations: textile design, product design, author
- Website: loriweitzner.com

Lori Weitzner is an American textile and product designer. She is the founder and Creative Director of Lori Weitzner Design, Inc., a New-York-based design studio, and the head of the Weitzner Limited brand. She has a jewelry and accessory collection under the brand Lori Weitzner launched in 2019 and is the author of Ode to Color published by HarperCollins.

== Biography ==
Weitzner studied design at Syracuse University and earned a BFA in Textiles. After graduating in 1983 she traveled to Europe where she worked as a freelance designer selling to Italian and Swiss fabric makers such as Missoni and Boller Winkler / Schlossberg. Afterward she returned to New York where she did packaging design for Estée Lauder, Elizabeth Arden and Calvin Klein; product design for Dansk, Rosenthal, Marcel Schurman and Johnson & Johnson; display design for Saks Fifth Avenue, Barneys and Florian Papp; and environmental designs for Lufthansa, amongst others.

In 2000 she began designing fabric for Sahco Hesslein. In 2004 she launched Weitzner Limited.

== Awards and recognition ==
Weitzner's work belongs to the permanent collections of such museums as Cooper Hewitt, Musee des Arts Decorates, the Museum of Architecture and Design, and London's Victoria and Albert Museum, among others. She is the recipient of over 25 design awards, including several Best of the Year awards from Interior Design Magazine and a nomination for a Chrysler Design Award.
