= Joshua N. Goldberg =

American physicist and educator (1925–2020)

- Born: May 30, 1925; Rochester, New York
- Died: October 5, 2020 (aged 95); Madison, Wisconsin
- Education: University of Rochester; Syracuse University
- Known for: General relativity
- Spouse: Gloria Lois Gerber Goldberg
- Scientific career
- Fields: Physics
- Workplaces: Armour Research Foundation; Aerospace Research Laboratories, U.S. Air Force; Syracuse University
- Thesis: Equations of motion in a covariant field theory (1952)
- Doctoral advisor: Peter Bergmann

Joshua N. Goldberg (May 30, 1925 – October 5, 2020) was an American physicist and educator who was particularly noted for his research on general relativity.

== Early life and education ==
Goldberg was born in Rochester, New York, and received a bachelor's degree from the University of Rochester in 1947. He received a doctorate in physics from Syracuse University in 1952. His thesis advisor was Peter Bergmann.

== Career ==
From 1952–1956 Goldberg was a research scientist at the Armour Research Foundation. He then worked at the Aerospace Research Laboratory at Wright Patterson Air Force Base, where over seven years he built a research group working on relativity. In 1963 Goldberg became a professor of physics at Syracuse University, where he was an emeritus professor of physics.

Goldberg is known for his research in general relativity, where he has written 61 papers. He and Rainer K. Sachs published the Goldberg-Sachs Theorem in 1962. Along with Bergmann, Goldberg introduced a new derivation of the laws of motion of rigid bodies according to the rigorous approach that they had developed.

Goldberg was elected a Fellow of the American Physical Society in 1972. In 2011, Goldberg's research career was honored by a special issue of the journal General Relativity and Gravitation.

== Death ==
Goldberg died in Madison, Wisconsin, on October 5, 2020, at the age of 95.
