= Jenni Lukac̆ =

Audio-visual artist

- Born: 1953 (age 72–73)
- Awards: Virginia Prize for Sculpture; 1990

Jenni Lukac̆ (born 1953) is an audio-visual artist best known for works focusing on the Holocaust and Holocaust survivors. She has been artist-in-residence at several Virginia schools.

== Art ==
She graduated from Syracuse University, and Maryland Institute College of Art.

Lukac̆ won first prize in the 1990 Virginia Commission for the Arts for her "delicate, dark assemblages" titled "Shrines." It is described as combining "the ironies of American assimilation with the loss of traditions and fundamental conflicts of faith."

She is perhaps best known for her multimedia installation Kaddish, based on photographs saved by Holocaust survivors, displayed in 1995 and 1996 at the National Museum of Women in the Arts. The show focused on artifacts preserved from before the war, to show "what was truly destroyed in the war - a human happiness and wholeness."

== Exhibitions ==
Lukac̆ had a show devoted to memory shrines entitled "Votive Shrine", at the Arlington Arts Center in late 1990.

In 1993, Lukac̆ was commissioned by the Miami Center for the Fine Arts to do a public piece entitle Port of Miami which juxtaposes photographs of Cuban émigrés arriving in Miami with contemporary images of Haitians and 1938 images of German Jewish refugees.

In 2016, Krannert Art Museum exhibited her work, Talitha Cumi (1992).
