= Kirthiga Reddy =

Indian-American businesswoman and Managing Director at Facebook India

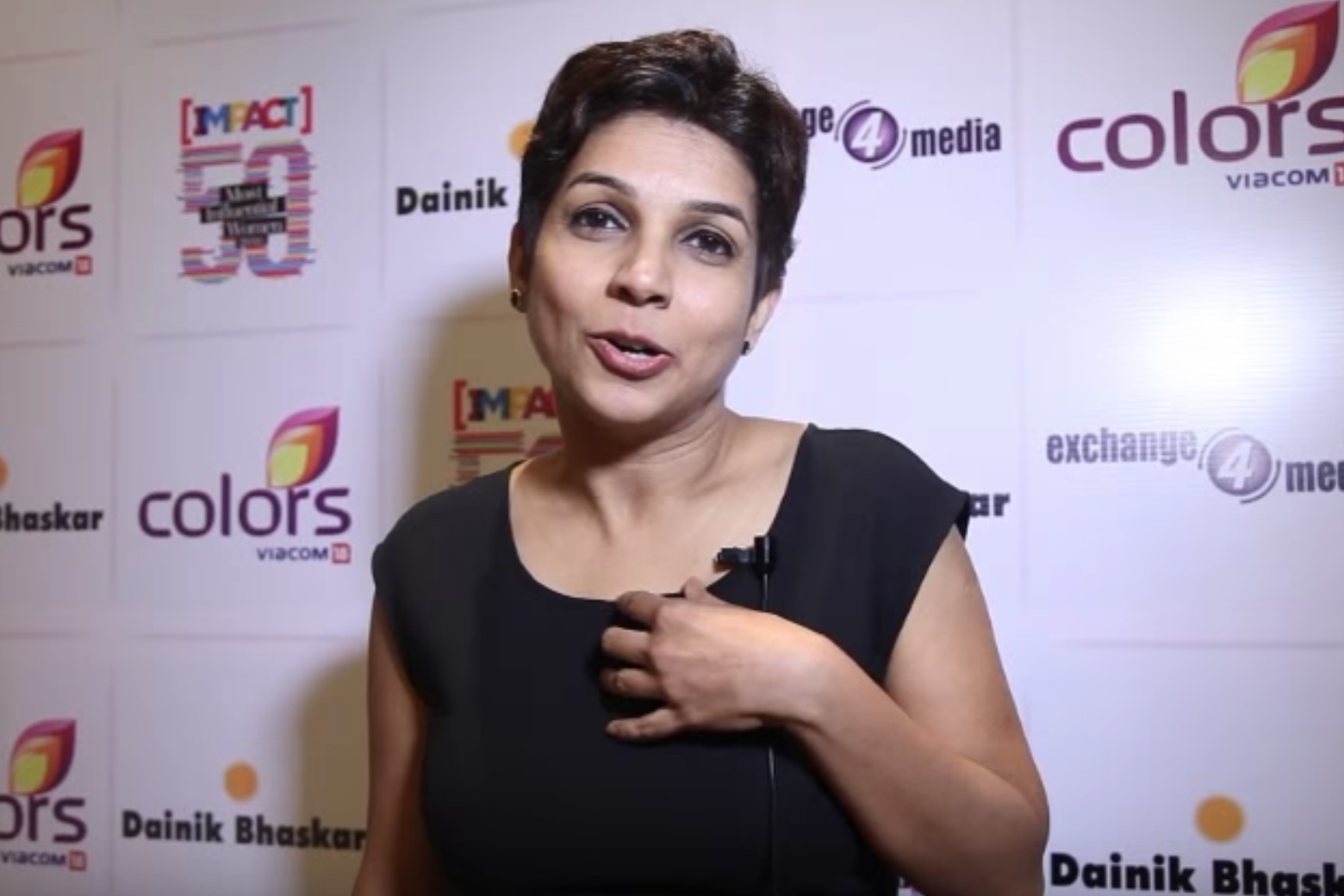
- Born: 1971 (age 54–55); Chennai, India
- Occupations: Venture Partner; SoftBank Group
- Spouse: Devanand Reddy
- Children: 2

Kirthiga Reddy (born c.1971) is an Indian-American businesswoman. She is the founder and CEO of Virtualness and the President of Athena SPACs.

She was a venture partner for SoftBank's US$100 billion Vision Fund. Reddy was SoftBank's first female investing partner and the former managing director of Facebook India.

She was the first employee of Facebook in India.

In 2011, she was included in Fortune India's list of the Top 50 Most Powerful Women. She has also been included in a list of India's 25 most influential women.

== Early life and education ==
Reddy grew up in India. Born to middle-class parents, her father was a government employee. She finished her Bachelors in Computer Science and Engineering from MGM'S College of Engineering, Nanded under Dr. Babasaheb Ambedkar Marathwada University, Maharashtra and stood second. After her graduation, she moved to Nagpur along with her parents and then briefly worked helping Yashavant Kanetkar with the programming examples in his books to illustrate key concepts. She then moved to United States and did her Master's in business administration from Stanford University and an M.S. in computer engineering from Syracuse University.

== Career ==
Reddy has worked with companies such as Silicon Graphics and Motorola. In 2008, Reddy moved back to India and started working with the US-based Phoenix Technologies.

In July 2010, Reddy joined Facebook. A day after shutting down 'Free Basics' scheme in India, Reddy announced her decision to step down from her post and relocate to the United States in six to twelve months.

In 2016 Reddy moved back to the United States.

== Personal life ==
She is married to her husband Dev and has two daughters.
