= Michael Streicher =

American metallurgist (1921–2006)

Michael A. Streicher (September 6, 1921 – February 14, 2006) was an American metallurgist and engineer who became internationally recognized for his work on the testing and development of corrosion-resistant stainless steel alloys. He published widely in technical journals and textbooks and received numerous patents for his inventions.

== Biography ==
He was born on September 6, 1921, in Heidelberg, Germany, the son of Johann Simon Streicher and Olga Schmidt Streicher. He immigrated with his family to the United States in 1931. Streicher received a B.S. degree in chemical engineering from Rensselaer Polytechnic Institute in 1943, an M.S. degree in chemical engineering from Syracuse University in 1945, and a doctorate in metallurgy from Lehigh University in 1947. The latter degree and subsequent postdoctoral research were sponsored by the U.S. Army Signal Corps. For 30 years, from 1949 to 1979, Streicher worked as a research metallurgist at the Experimental Station of the DuPont Co. in Wilmington, Delaware. He began as a research engineer, advancing to the positions of research fellow and principal consultant. For the next eight years, he served as research professor at the University of Delaware in the Department of Mechanical Engineering. Thereafter, he worked as an independent consultant, including work with the Nuclear Waste Technical Review Board (NWTRB) on safe storage containers for nuclear waste.

His pioneering work developing superferritic stainless steels led to the development of new alloys (see United States Patents 3957544, 4119765, 4456482 and 4456483) which find extensive use in high-efficiency home gas furnaces, as well as in industry.

Streicher was a leading developer of corrosion tests for stainless steels and other corrosion resistant alloys. Working through ASTM International he was instrumental in standardizing intergranular corrosion tests, including the ferric sulfate-sulfuric acid test now called the "Streicher Test" in his honor.

In 1973, Streicher received the Willis Rodney Whitney Award given to one scientist each year by NACE International, which is a professional organization devoted to corrosion and related problems.

Streicher also received other prestigious awards, including Fellow of the American Society for Metals (1970) and Fellow of NACE (1994).

== Patents ==
- 2793191 Streicher "Corrosion Inhibition of Monobasic Acids" May 21, 1957
- 2806000 Streicher "Cleaning Stainless Steel" September 10, 1957
- 2839392 Streicher "Corrosion Resistant Alloy" June 17, 1958
- 2976169 Streicher "Immersion Deposition of Tin" May 21, 1961
- 3481762 Streicher "Metal Lubrication Process" December 2, 1969
- 3929473 Streicher "Chromium, molybdenum ferritic stainless steels" December 30, 1975
- 3932174 Streicher "Chromium, molybdenum ferritic stainless steels" January 13, 1976
- 3932175 Streicher "Chromium, molybdenum ferritic stainless steels" January 13, 1976

== Awards ==
- Fellow of ASM International (1970)
- Willis Rodney Whitney Award from NACE International (1973)
- Fellow of NACE International (1994).

== Works ==
- PITTING CORROSION OF 18Cr-8Ni STAINLESS STEEL, Journal of the Electrochemical Society (U.S.) Absorbed Electrochem. Technol.; Vol: 103, Pages: 375-90, 1956 Jul 01.
- Synergistic inhibition of ferric ion corrosion during chemical cleaning of metal surfaces, Corrosion (Houston); Vol/Issue: 28:4, 1972 Apr 01.
- Development of pitting-resistant Fe--Cr--Mo alloys, Corrosion, v. 30, no. 3, pp. 77–91, 1974 Mar 01.
- Microstructures and some properties of Fe-28%Cr-4%Mo alloys, Corrosion, v. 30, no. 4, pp. 115–124, 1974 Apr 01.
- Effect of composition and structure on crevice, intergranular, and stress corrosion of some wrought Ni--Cr--Mo alloys, Corrosion; Vol/Issue: 32:3, 1976 Mar 01.
- Stainless Steels: Past, Present and Future, pp 1–34 in Stainless Steel '77, Metals Soc., London, (1977)
- Effect of silicon on the corrosion resistance of iron in sulfuric acid, (with B. J. Saldanha) Mater. Performance; Vol/Issue: 25:1, 1986 Jan 01.
- Galvanic Corrosion of Duplex Fe-Cr-10% Ni Alloys in Reducing Acids (with Y. H. Yau) in ASTM STP 978, ASTM International, "Galvanic Corrosion", 1988.
- Guidelines for Development of Structural Integrity Programs for DOE High-Level Waste Storage Tanks (with K. Bandyopadhyay, S. Bush, M. Kassir, B. Mather, P. Shewmon, B. Thompson, D. van Rooyen, and J. Weeks) BNL-52527, 1997. Brookhaven National Laboratory, Upton, New York.
- Limitations on use of pitting potential measurements, Materials Performance; VOL. 36; ISSUE: 1, 1997 Jan 01.
- Effect of alloying elements on stress corrosion cracking of stainless alloys, Materials Performance; VOL. 36; ISSUE: 11, 1997 Nov 01.
- Effect of condenser design on stress corrosion cracking of stainless alloys in boiling chloride solutions, (with Y. L. Chiang), Corrosion; VOL. 54; ISSUE: 9, 1998 Sep 01.
- Materials problems with temporary and permanent storage of high-level nuclear wastes, Materials Performance; Vol/Issue: 38:1, 1999 Jan 01.
- Austenitic and Ferritic Stainless Steels, Uhlig's Corrosion Handbook, Second Edition, R. Winston Revie, Ed., John Wiley & Sons, 2000.
