= Kim Ponders =

American writer

Kimberly A. Ponders is an American fiction writer and former military aircrew weapons controller. Her first novel, The Art of Uncontrolled Flight, was released with HarperCollins in September 2005. Her second novel, The Last Blue Mile, was released 22 May 2007.

== Early life and career ==
Kim grew up near Boston, Massachusetts, and graduated from Syracuse University. She worked as a small-town reporter in northern California.

In 1989, she attended Officer Training School and was commissioned into the United States Air Force as a second lieutenant. In 1991, she became qualified as an air weapons controller on the E-3 AWACS and went to Saudi Arabia with Desert Storm, becoming one of the first American women to fly in a combat zone. She spent the next five years flying missions out of Saudi Arabia and Turkey, providing air supplies to the Kurds in northern Iraq and monitoring the Iraqi no-fly zone. These experiences formed the basis of her first novel, The Art of Uncontrolled Flight.

Now a lieutenant colonel, Kim is the lead speechwriter for Lieutenant General John Bradley, Chief of the Air Force Reserve. She holds an M.S. in international relations and an M.F.A. from the Warren Wilson Program for Writers. She has written about the current Iraq war on blogsites such as Femme La Guerre and BlogHer, a women's news and features site. She teaches at a conference run by A Room of Her Own, the largest women-only writer's foundation in the country. Kim also has reviewed books for The Washington Post.

She lives in southern New Hampshire with her husband and two boys.

== Bibliography ==
=== Novels ===
- The Art of Uncontrolled Flight (HarperCollins, 2005) ISBN 0060786086
- The Last Blue Mile (HarperCollins, June 2007) ISBN 0060847069
