= Lawrence Rudner =

Americna research statistician

Lawrence M. Rudner
- Occupations: Assessment consultant and research statistician
- Known for: Measurement decision theory and classification accuracy

Academic background
- Education: B.S. Mathematics; M.S. Education; Ph.D. Psychology and Evaluation; M.B.A. Finance and Entrepreneurship
- Alma mater: Syracuse University; Western Connecticut State University; The Catholic University of America (with honors); University of Maryland

Lawrence M. Rudner is a research statistician and consultant whose work spans domains, including, statistical analysis, computer programming, web development, and oyster farming. He is the owner and president of Oyster Girl Oysters, and is an instructor at the Chesapeake Forum and the Chesapeake Bay Maritime Museum. He is the founder and former editor of the Practical Assessment, Research, and Evaluation journal.

Rudner has conducted research on measurement topics, including using Item Response Theory, IRT, for assessing item bias, parameter invariance, person fit validity, and classification accuracy, utilizing research methods, psychometrics, data analysis, and programming languages. He has written more than 150 scholarly papers and 40 grants, with contributions featured in books and chapters published by institutions, earning him the Award for Outstanding Dissemination of Educational Measurement Concepts to the Public from National Council on Measurement in Education, and the Career Achievement Award from the Association of Test Publishers.

Rudner held the position of senior fellow at the American Institutes for Research.

== Education ==
Rudner earned his Bachelor of Science in mathematics from Syracuse University in 1971. He continued his education with a Master of Science in Education from Western Connecticut State University in 1972 and completed his Doctorate in Psychology and Evaluation at The Catholic University. In 1991, he pursued an MBA in Finance and Entrepreneurship at the University of Maryland.

== Career ==
Rudner served as the head of the Educational Resources Information Center (ERIC) Clearing House on Assessment, and as project officer for the National Assessment of Educational Progress. From 2004 to 2014, he was the vice president for Research and Psychometrics at the Graduate Management Admission Council (GMAC).

Prior to joining GMAC, Rudner was a senior associate (GS-15) in the US Government, where he was the project officer for the National Assessment of Educational Progress (NAEP), director of the ERIC Clearinghouse on Assessment and Evaluation, and a faculty member at universities. Since 2021, he has been an instructor at the Chesapeake Forum, teaching courses on artificial intelligence, cybersecurity, and internet safety and the Chesapeake Bay Maritime Museum, teaching classes on oyster gardening.

Rudner has been serving as the owner and president of Oyster Girl Oysters. Along with Willem Roosenburg, he invented a cost-effective oyster cage flipping system for which he received a patent in 2024. He has also authored a paper on predicting oyster volume for the East Coast Shellfish Growers Association.

== Contributions to the field ==
Rudner created some of the first tools for first engines for automated essay scoring, automated test assembly, and computer adaptive testing. He devised an AI method for documenting copyright infringements receiving a US patent in 2009 and developed the Bayesian Essay Test Scoring System, a Windows-based open-source program for automated essay scoring applicable to various text classification tasks. He created an online interactive tutorial on decision theory comparing it with Item Response Theory and exploring the calibration sample size needed for accurate classifications.

Rudner directed the activities of the ERIC Clearinghouse on Assessment and Evaluation. One of his key projects was developing the Search ERIC Wizard, a search engine for the ERIC database that used a thesaurus as a front end.

Rudner's most cited research project was an examination of the achievement levels of a large sample of home school students. This study received coverage in newspapers. He also appeared on CSPAN's Washington Journal and the Washington Post to discuss the report.

In the publication What Teachers Need to Know About Assessment, part of NEA's Student Assessment Series, Rudner alongside William D. Schafer, provided comprehensive information on high-stakes testing, test scoring, and classroom management. He also conducted a report evaluating the IntelliMetric automated essay scoring system's performance compared to human raters using essays from the GMAT Analytic Writing Assessment.

In 2019, Rudner examined the application of measurement decision theory for classifying examinees, evaluating its effectiveness in terms of classification accuracy, sequential testing procedures, and the minimum number of items required for accurate classification.

== Awards and honors ==
- 2004 – Award for Outstanding Dissemination of Educational Measurement Concepts to the Public, National Council on Measurement in Education
- 2009 – Career Achievement Award, Association of Test Publishers

== Selected articles ==
- Rudner, L. M. (1980). Biased Item Detection Techniques. Journal of Educational Statistics, 5(3), 213–33.
- Rudner, L. M. (1999). Achievement and Demographics of Home School Students: 1998. Education Policy Analysis Archives, 7(8), 8-8.
- Rudner, L. M., & Liang, T. (2002). Automated essay scoring using Bayes' theorem. The Journal of Technology, Learning and Assessment, 1(2).
- Rudner, L. M., & Schafer, W. D. (2002). What teachers need to know about assessment. National Education Association, 17–20.
- Rudner, L. M. (2019). Expected classification accuracy. Practical Assessment, Research, and Evaluation, 10(1), 13.
- Rudner, L. M. (2019). Scoring and classifying examinees using measurement decision theory. Practical Assessment, Research, and Evaluation, 14(1), 8.
