= Evangelia Micheli-Tzanakou =

Greek bioengineer

- Born: March 22, 1942; Athens, Greece
- Died: September 24, 2012 (aged 70); New Jersey, USA
- Education: University of Athens, B.S. Syracuse University, M.S. and Ph.D.
- Occupations: Biomedical engineer University professor
- Spouse: George S. Tzanakos (1940–2013)

Evangelia Micheli-Tzanakou (March 22, 1942 – September 24, 2012) was a professor of biomedical engineering and the director of Computational Intelligence Laboratories at Rutgers University. Dr. Micheli-Tzanakou was also a founding fellow of the American Institute for Medical and Biological Engineering (AIMBE), a Fellow of the Institute of Electrical and Electronics Engineers (IEEE), and a Fellow of the New Jersey Academy of Medicine. Dr. Micheli-Tzanakou's areas of interest included neural networks, information processing in the brain, image and signal processing applied to biomedicine, telemedicine, mammography, hearing aids and electronic equivalents of neurons. Dr. Micheli-Tzanakou received international attention in 1974 when she established the first Brain to Computer Interface (BCI) using her algorithm ALOPEX. This method was used in the study of Parkinson's disease. The ALOPEX algorithm has also been applied toward signal processing, image processing, and pattern recognition. Dr. Micheli-Tzanakou died on September 24, 2012, after a long fight with cancer.

== Early life and education ==
Evangelia Micheli-Tzanakou was born in Greece on March 22, 1942. She earned her Bachelor of Science (B.S.) in physics from the University of Athens in 1969. She then moved to the United States, where she completed her Master of Science (M.S.) and Ph.D. in physics from Syracuse University in 1974 and 1977, respectively. Her doctoral research focused on biophysics, and she continued her work as a postdoctoral fellow at Syracuse University from 1977 to 1980. She died on September 24, 2012.

== Academic and professional career ==
After completing her postdoctoral studies, Micheli-Tzanakou joined Rutgers University in 1981, where she became a professor in the Department of Biomedical Engineering. She served as the chair of the Department of Biomedical Engineering at Rutgers from 1990 to 2000, during which she established one of the first and most renowned undergraduate biomedical engineering programs in the United States. Her research interests spanned a wide range of fields, including image and signal processing, artificial neural networks, biometrics, and computational intelligence. She was particularly known for her work on the ALOPEX process, an optimization technique used in various applications, including the extraction of visual evoked potentials (VEPs) and blood cell identification.

== Books ==
- Deutsch, Sid; Micheli-Tzanakou, Evangelia (1987). Neuroelectric Systems. New York University Press. ISBN 9780814717820. OCLC 14818280.
- Micheli-Tzanakou, Evangelia (January 2000). Supervised and Unsupervised Pattern Recognition: Feature Extraction in Computational Intelligence. CRC Press. ISBN 9780849322785. OCLC 42080284.
- Supervised and Unsupervised Pattern Recognition: Feature Extraction and Computational Intelligence (Industrial Electronics), 1st Edition.

== Awards ==
- Meritorious Achievement Award, Institute of Electrical and Electronics Engineers, 2010. Micheli-Tzanakou's citation reads "for vision and leadership in establishing the IEEE Biometrics Certification Program."
- Meritorious Service Award, Institute of Electrical and Electronics Engineers - CIS, 2006.
- New Jersey Women of Achievement Award, 1995. "For the application of neural networks to engineering in medicine and biology".
- Achievement Award of the Society of Women Engineers, 1992
- Outstanding Advisor Award, Institute of Electrical and Electronics Engineers (IEEE), 1985.

== Education ==
- B.S. Physics, University of Athens, Greece, 1968
- M.A. Physics, Syracuse University, 1974
- Ph.D. Physics, Syracuse University, 1977
