= ALOPEX =

ALOPEX (an abbreviation of "algorithms of pattern extraction") is a correlation based machine learning algorithm first proposed by Tzanakou and Harth in 1974.

== Principle ==
In machine learning, the goal is to train a system to minimize a cost function or (referring to ALOPEX) a response function. Many training algorithms, such as backpropagation, have an inherent susceptibility to getting "stuck" in local minima or maxima of the response function. ALOPEX uses a cross-correlation of differences and a stochastic process to overcome this in an attempt to reach the absolute minimum (or maximum) of the response function.

== Method ==
ALOPEX, in its simplest form is defined by an updating equation:

$$\Delta\ W_{ij}(n) = \gamma\ \Delta\ W_{ij}(n-1) \Delta\ R(n) + r_i(n)$$

where:

- $n \geq 0$ is the iteration or time-step.
- $\Delta\ W_{ij}(n)$ is the difference between the current and previous value of system variable $\ W_{ij}$ at iteration $n$.
- $\Delta\ R(n)$ is the difference between the current and previous value of the response function $\ R,$ at iteration $n$.
- $\gamma$ is the learning rate parameter $(\gamma\ < 0$ minimizes $R,$ and $\gamma\ > 0$ maximizes $R \ )$
- $r_i(n) \sim\ N(0,\sigma\ ^2)$

== Discussion ==
Essentially, ALOPEX changes each system variable $W_{ij}(n)$ based on a product of: the previous change in the variable $\Delta$$W_{ij}(n-1)$, the resulting change in the cost function $\Delta$$R(n)$, and the learning rate parameter $\gamma$. Further, to find the absolute minimum (or maximum), the stochastic process $r_{ij}(n)$ (Gaussian or other) is added to stochastically "push" the algorithm out of any local minima.
