= Vincenzo C. Vannicola =

American electrical engineer (1932–2026)

- Born: Vincent Christopher Vannicola; September 8, 1932; New Haven, Connecticut, U.S.
- Died: March 19, 2026 (aged 93); Barneveld, New York, U.S.
- Education: University of Connecticut; Syracuse University
- Occupation: Electrical engineer
- Spouse(s): Carolyn Sanders Catherine Porter (m. 1976; died. 2025)

Vincent Christopher Vannicola (September 8, 1932 – March 19, 2026) was an American electrical engineer.

== Early life and career ==
Vannicola was born in New Haven, Connecticut, on September 8, 1932, the son of Romano Vannicola and Mary Nuzzo. He attended Wilbur Cross High School, graduating in 1951. After graduating, he attended the University of Connecticut, earning his bachelor's degree in physics in 1956. He also attended Syracuse University, earning his master's degree in electromagnetics in 1968 and his PhD degree in signal processing engineering in 1982.

He worked as an engineer at General Electric in Utica, New York, and was a signal processing engineer for the Air Force Research Laboratory until 1996. In the same year, he was named a fellow of the Institute of Electrical and Electronics Engineers, "for technical contributions to radar signal processing theory and practice".

== Personal life and death ==
Vannicola was first married to Carolyn Sanders, but their marriage ended. In 1976, he then married Catherine Porter. Their marriage lasted until her death in 2025.

Vannicola died at his home in Barneveld, New York, on March 19, 2026, at the age of 93.
