= Peter Bergmann =

German-American physicist (1915–2002)

- Born: Peter Gabriel Bergmann; March 24, 1915; Berlin, German Empire
- Died: October 19, 2002 (aged 87); Seattle, Washington, U.S.
- Education: German University of Prague; TU Dresden
- Spouse: Margot Bergmann
- Children: 2
- Awards: Albert Einstein Medal (1992); Einstein Prize (2003)
- Scientific career
- Fields: Unified field theory; Kaluza–Klein theory
- Workplaces: Syracuse University; Institute for Advanced Study
- Thesis: The Harmonic Oscillator in a Spherical Space (1936)
- Doctoral advisor: Philipp Frank
- Other academic advisors: Albert Einstein
- Doctoral students: Joel Lebowitz; Pantur Silaban; John Boardman; Ezra T. Newman; Rainer K. Sachs; Jeffrey H. Winicour

Peter Gabriel Bergmann (March 24, 1915 – October 19, 2002) was a German-American physicist best remembered for his work with Albert Einstein on a unified field theory and for reviving interest in general relativity after World War II. He also introduced primary and secondary constraints into mechanics.

== Early life and education ==
Bergmann was born into a Jewish family of Max Bergmann, a biochemist, and Emmy Bergmann, a pediatrician in Berlin. His father later became a professor of chemistry at the Rockefeller Institute for Medical Research. He began college in 1931, at the age of 16, at Technische Hochschule (now TU Dresden) under the mentorship of Harry Dember. Although he was not averse to laboratory exercises, he was more inclined towards theoretical physics. He moved to Freiburg and began attending the lectures of Gustav Mie. He intended to matriculate at the University of Berlin, but realized that as a Jew, his prospects were dim following the inauguration of Adolf Hitler as Chancellor in 1933. Bergmann promptly went to Czechoslovakia and subsequently obtained his PhD at the age of 21 from the German University in Prague in 1936 under the direction of Philipp Frank.

Bergmann's family scattered all over the world during Nazi rule; his aunt Clara stayed behind and ultimately was murdered at Auschwitz.

== Career ==
Bergmann's association with Einstein began without his knowledge in 1933 when his mother wrote a letter to Einstein, who was then in Belgium hiding from the Nazis, asking if her son could work under him as a doctoral candidate. But Einstein suggested that Bergmann study with Wolfgang Pauli instead. Bergmann contacted Einstein again in 1935 and arrived in the United States in 1936. It was Philipp Frank who recommended Bergmann as a research assistant for Einstein. He worked with Einstein at the Institute for Advanced Study in Princeton, New Jersey, from October 1936 to June 1941. During this period, he helped Einstein in the quest for a unified field theory encompassing Einstein's theory of gravity (general relativity) and Maxwell's equations of electromagnetism. They pursued the Kaluza–Klein theory and published two joint papers. In the second one, they were joined by Valentin Bargmann. At this time, Einstein and his collaborators investigated numerous possible approaches to a unified field theory. By the 1940s, however, Einstein had lost interest in the (five-dimensional) Kaluza–Klein theory. which was found to be in serious disagreement with experiments. For instance, its predicted mass for the electron was off by a factor of 10^{18}.

After his time at Princeton, Bergmann taught at Black Mountain College in North Carolina in the academic year 1941–42 and Lehigh University in Pennsylvania from 1942 to 1944. From 1944 to 1947, he participated in war-related research for the United States Navy on the propagation of sound underwater at Columbia University and the Woods Hole Oceanographic Institution in Massachusetts.

Bergmann work at Syracuse University in New York State from 1947 to 1982, becoming a full professor in 1953. He supervised 32 doctoral students including Joel Lebowitz, Pantur Silaban, John Boardman, Ezra T. Newman, and Rainer K. Sachs.

In 1947, no department of physics in the United States had a center for research in general relativity. Most American graduate programs in physics neither offered courses on the subject nor required knowledge of it for qualifying exams. At Syracuse, Bergmann established one of the first research centers devoted to studying the general theory of relativity and to reconcile it with quantum theory. In a 1949 paper, Bergmann outlined the goal of his research program, expressing the key ideas of non-perturbative canonical general relativity. For the rest of his career, he was interested in a variety of different topics on theoretical physics, including general covariance, canonical quantum gravity, and relativistic statistical mechanics. He was a pioneer of constrained Hamiltonian dynamics.

Bergmann and his students were the primary contributors to the literature of general relativity until the mid-1950s. Subsequent decades saw enormous growth in research on various aspects of gravitational physics. General relativity had entered the mainstream of research. Bergmann facilitated this trend not just with his research but also his teaching and administrative skills. He was one of the principal organizers of the inaugural Texas Symposium on Relativistic Astrophysics in Dallas, 1963.

When Edward P. Tryon came out in 1973 with a paper in Nature titled "Is the Universe a Vacuum Fluctuation?”, Tryon mentions how he learned from Bergmann how our universe could have started with zero energy and not contradict the conservation of energy law because mass-energy is positive and gravitational energy is negative and they cancel each other out and so our universe than could begin with zero energy.

After retiring from Syracuse in 1982, he was appointed a visiting professor at New York University (NYU), a position he kept until his death. At NYU, he worked with his close friend, physicist Engelbert Schücking in organizing a seminar on relativity until he was forced to stop by illness.

Bergmann had an Erdős number of 2 (via Ernst G. Straus to Paul Erdős).

== Publications ==
In 1942, Bergmann published the first textbook on general relativity, Introduction to the Theory of Relativity, with a foreword by Einstein, who predicted—correctly—that the teaching of relativity would expand in the future. The second edition of this book was published by Dover Publications in 1976. It was an important textbook on the subject, studied extensively during the mid-twentieth century, and was translated to multiple languages. It is a systematic exposition on relativity with an emphasis on geometry, and on motion in curved spacetime. In this sense, the book follows the footsteps of Einstein, Arthur Stanley Eddington, and Richard Chace Tolman. This book is divided into three parts: special relativity, general relativity, and unified field theories. However, it does not discuss the Minkowski spacetime or the cosmological implications of general relativity.

His other textbooks were:

- The Riddle of Gravitation (Dover Publications, OCLC, 1993)
- Basic Theories of Physics (Prentice Hall, OCLC, 1951)
- Albert Einstein: His Influence on Physics, Philosophy and Politics with Peter C. Aichelburg and Roman Ulrich Sexl (Vieweg, OCLC 1979).

== Awards ==
In 1992, the Albert Einstein Society in Switzerland awarded Bergmann the Albert Einstein Medal. In 2002, shortly before his death, Bergmann learned that he and John Archibald Wheeler had won the inaugural Einstein Prize from the American Physical Society (APS) for "pioneering investigations in general relativity, including gravitational radiation, black holes, spacetime singularities, and symmetries in Einstein’s equations, and for leadership and inspiration to generations of researchers in general relativity."

== Death ==
He died in Seattle, Washington, after a long illness.
