= LED display =

Display technology

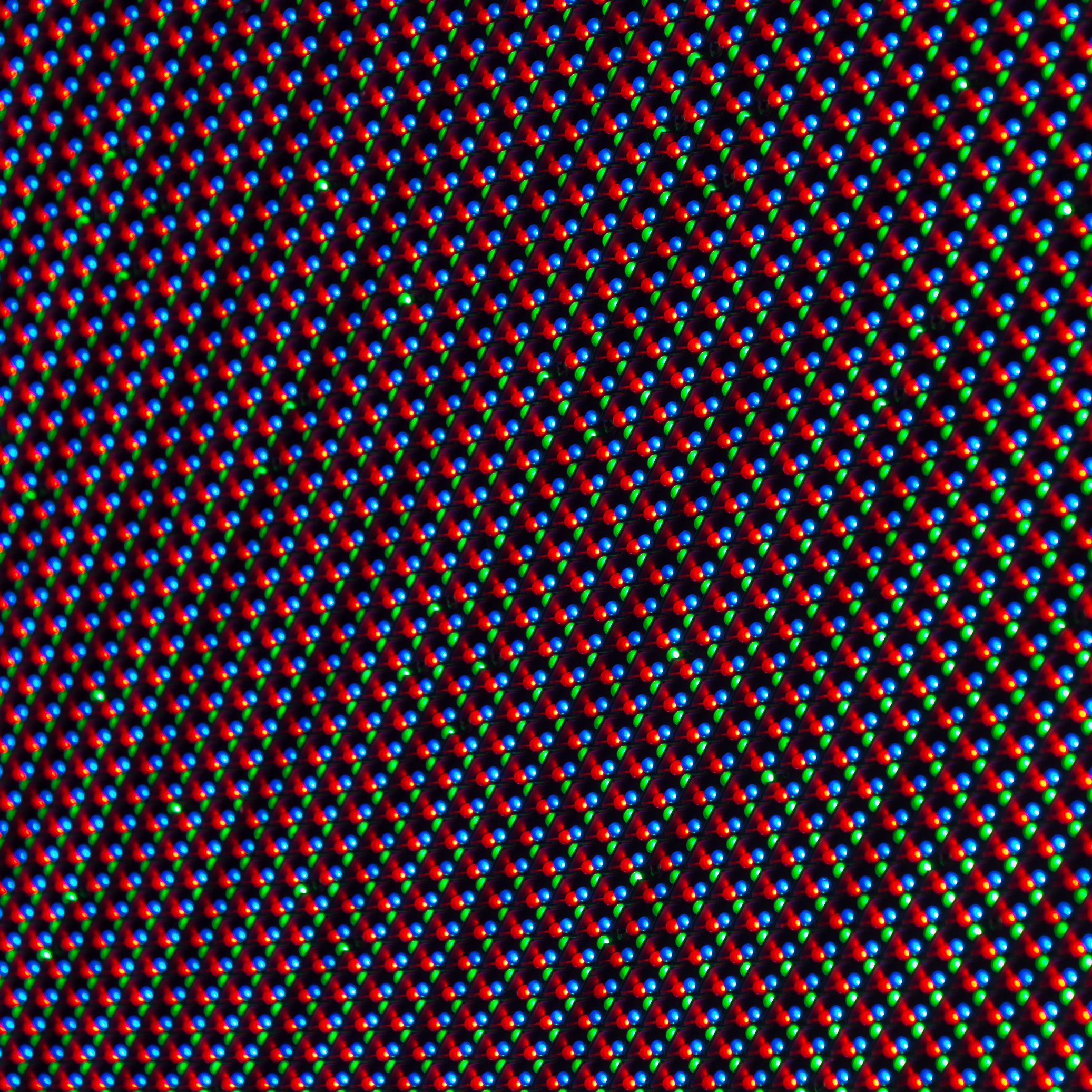
Detail view of an LED display with a matrix of red, green and blue diodes

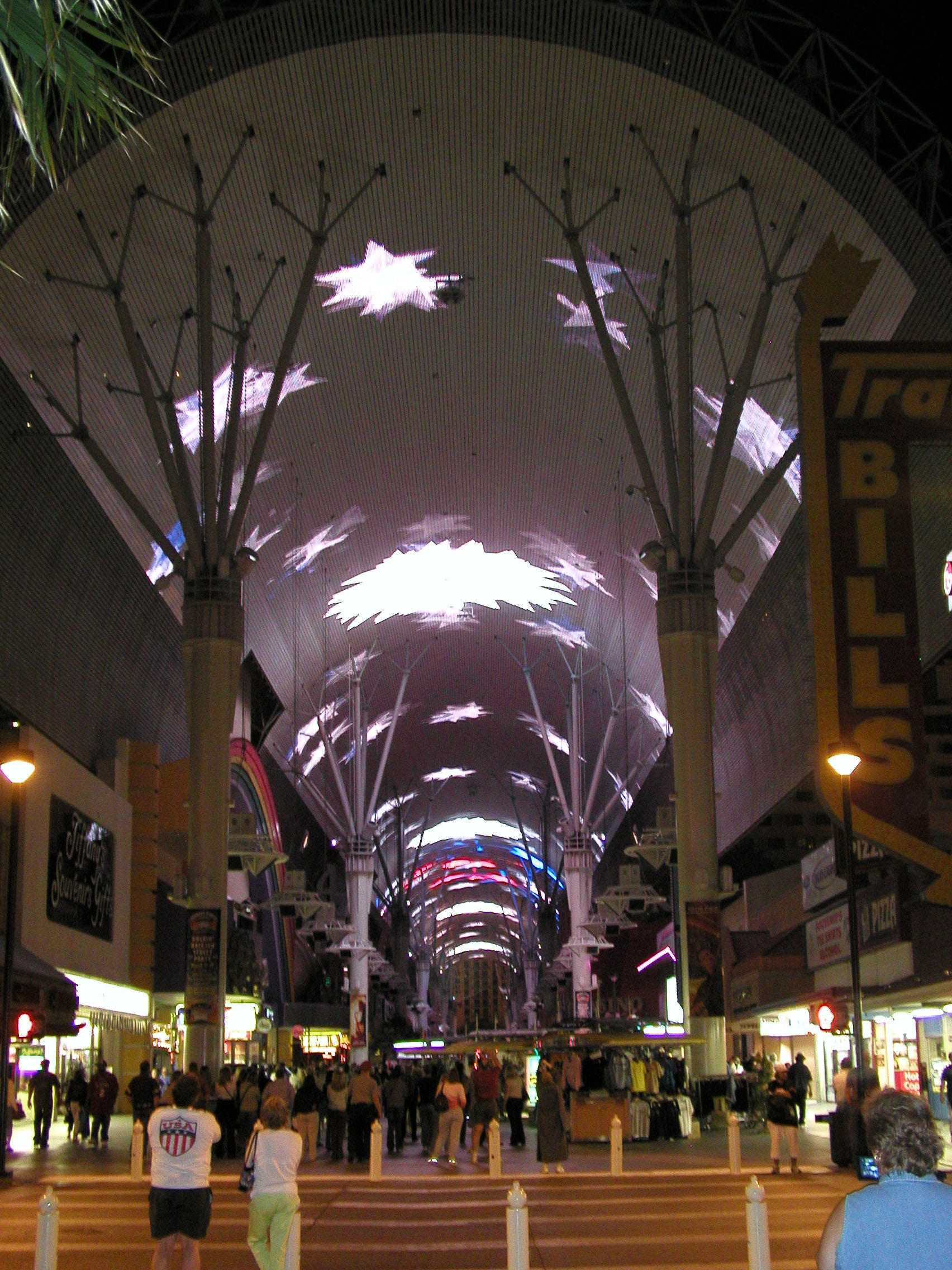
The 1,500-foot (460 m) long LED display on the Fremont Street Experience in Downtown Las Vegas, Nevada, is currently the largest in the world.

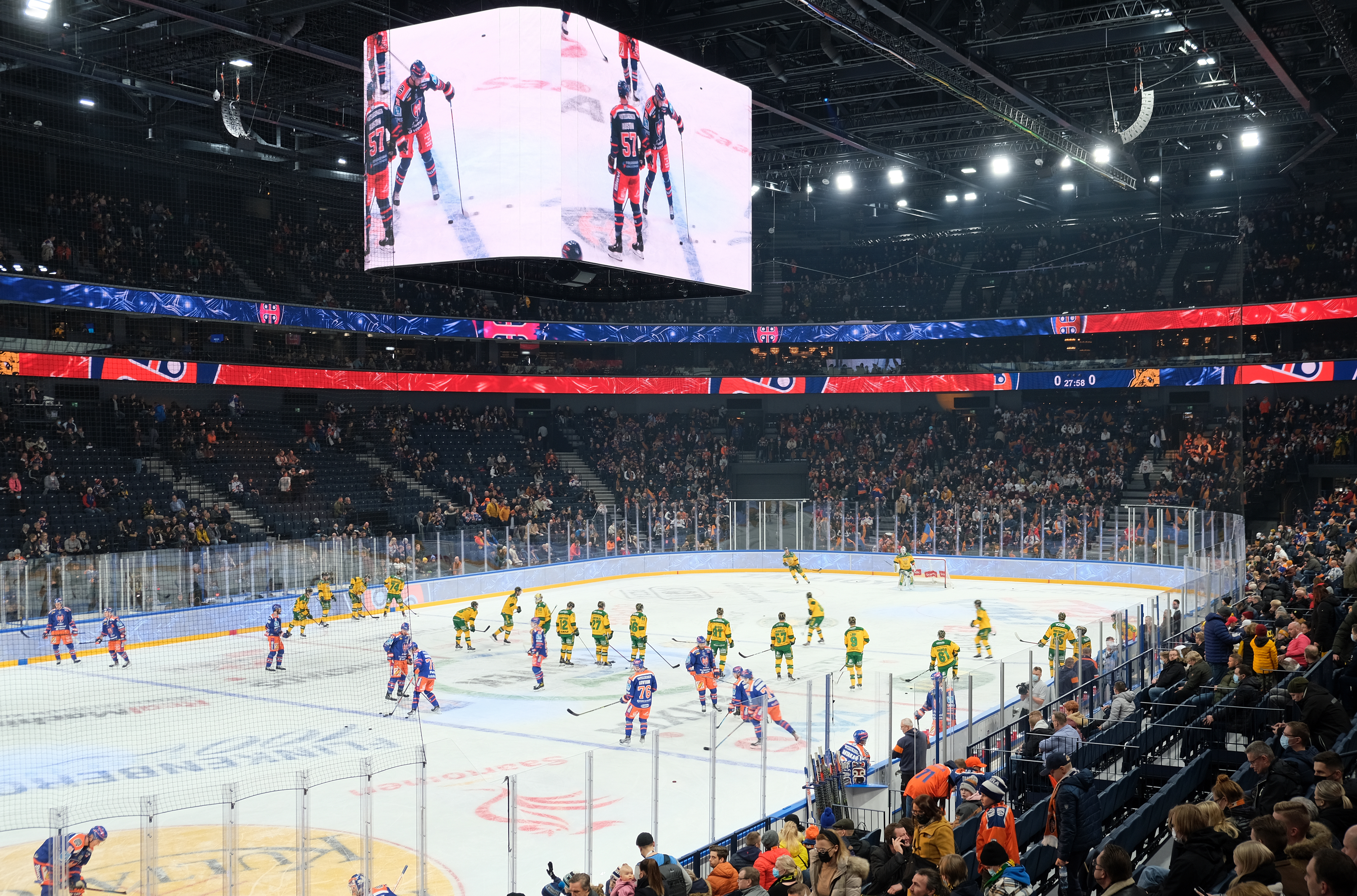
A LED video cube above the ice rink at Nokia Arena in Tampere, Finland

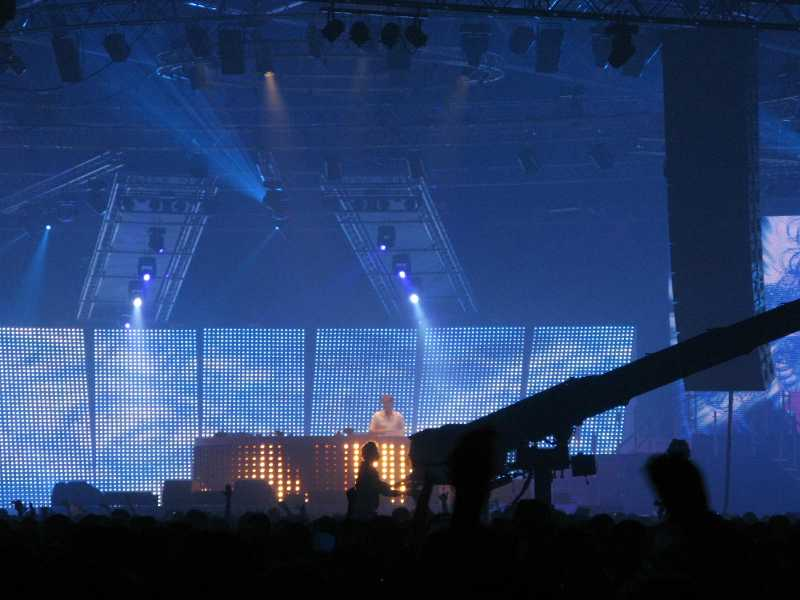
The 40m large LED display at the Armin Only event in April 2008 in the Jaarbeurs Utrecht

A LED display is a flat-panel display that uses an array of light-emitting diodes (LEDs) as pixels for a video display. Their brightness allows them to be used outdoors where they are visible in the sun for store signs and billboards. In recent years, they have also become commonly used in destination signs on public transport vehicles, as well as variable-message signs on highways. LED displays are capable of providing general illumination in addition to visual display, as when used for stage lighting or other decorative (as opposed to informational) purposes. LED displays can offer higher contrast ratios and refresh rates than a projector and are thus an alternative to traditional projection screens, and they can be used for large, uninterrupted (without a visible grid arising from the bezels of individual displays) video walls. microLED displays are LED displays with smaller LEDs, which poses significant development challenges.

Their use in cinemas to replace projectors and projection screens has been explored.

== History ==
Light-emitting diodes (LEDs) came into existence in 1962 and were primarily red in color for the first decade. The first practical LED was invented by Nick Holonyak in 1962 while he was at General Electric.

The first practical LED display was developed at Hewlett-Packard (HP) and introduced in 1968. Its development was led by Howard C. Borden and Gerald P. Pighini at HP Associates and HP Labs, who had engaged in research and development (R&D) on practical LEDs between 1962 and 1968. In February 1969, they introduced the HP Model 5082-7000 Numeric Indicator. It was the first LED device to use integrated circuit (integrated LED circuit) technology, and the first intelligent LED display, making it a revolution in digital display technology, replacing the Nixie tube and becoming the basis for later LED displays.

Early models were monochromatic by design. The efficient Blue LED completing the color triad did not commercially arrive until the late 1980s.

In the late 1980s, Aluminium Indium Gallium Phosphide LEDs arrived. They provided an efficient source of red and amber and were used in information displays. However, it was still impossible to achieve full colour. The available "green" was hardly green at all – mostly yellow, and an early blue had excessively high power consumption. It was only when Shuji Nakamura, then at Nichia Chemical, announced the development of the blue (and later green) LED based on Indium Gallium Nitride, that possibilities opened for big LED video displays.

The entire idea of what could be done with LED was given an early shake up by Mark Fisher's design for U2's PopMart Tour of 1997. He realized that with long viewing distances, wide pixel spacing could be used to achieve very large images, especially if viewed at night. The system had to be suitable for touring so an open mesh arrangement that could be rolled up for transport was used. The whole display was 52m (170ft) wide and 17m (56ft) high. It had a total of 150,000 pixels. The company that supplied the LED pixels and their driving system, SACO Technologies of Montreal, had never engineered a video system before, previously building mimic panels for power station control rooms.

Today, large displays use high-brightness diodes to generate a wide spectrum of colors. It took three decades and organic light-emitting diodes for Sony to introduce an OLED TV, the Sony XEL-1 OLED screen which was marketed in 2009. Later, at CES 2012, Sony presented Crystal LED, a TV with a true LED-display, in which LEDs are used to produce actual images rather than acting as backlighting for other types of display, as in LED-backlit LCDs which are commonly marketed as LED TVs.

== Development ==
=== Early prototypes ===
A claim for the 'first all-LED flat panel television screen' is presented in this section. It was possibly developed, demonstrated and documented by James P. Mitchell in 1977. Initial public recognition came from the Westinghouse Educational Foundation Science Talent Search group, a Science Service organization. The paper entry was named in the "Honors Group" publicized to universities on January 25, 1978. The paper was subsequently invited and presented at the Iowa Academy of Science at the University of Northern Iowa. The operational prototype was displayed at the Eastern Iowa SEF on March 18 and obtained a top "Physical Sciences" award and IEEE recognition. The project was again displayed at the 29th International SEF at Anaheim Ca. Convention Center on May 8–10. The ¼-inch thin miniature flat panel modular prototype, scientific paper, and full screen (tiled LED matrix) schematic with video interface was displayed at this event. It received awards by NASA and General Motors Corporation. This project marked some of the earliest progress towards the replacement of the 70+-year-old high-voltage analog CRT system (cathode-ray tube technology) with a digital x-y scanned LED matrix driven with an NTSC television RF video format. Mitchell's paper and operational prototype projected the future replacement of CRTs and included foreseen applications to battery operated devices due to the advantages of low power consumption. Displacement of the electromagnetic scan systems included the removal of inductive deflection, electron beam and color convergence circuits and has been a significant achievement. The unique properties of the light-emitting diode as an emissive device simplify matrix scanning complexity and have helped the modern television adapt to digital communications and shrink into its current thin form factor.

The 1977 model was monochromatic by design.

=== Recent developments ===
MicroLED displays are currently under development by numerous major corporations such as Sony, Samsung, and LG.

These displays are easily scalable, and offer a more streamlined production process. However, production costs remains a limiting factor.

== See also ==
- OLED
- AMOLED
