= LED-backlit LCD =

Display technology implementation

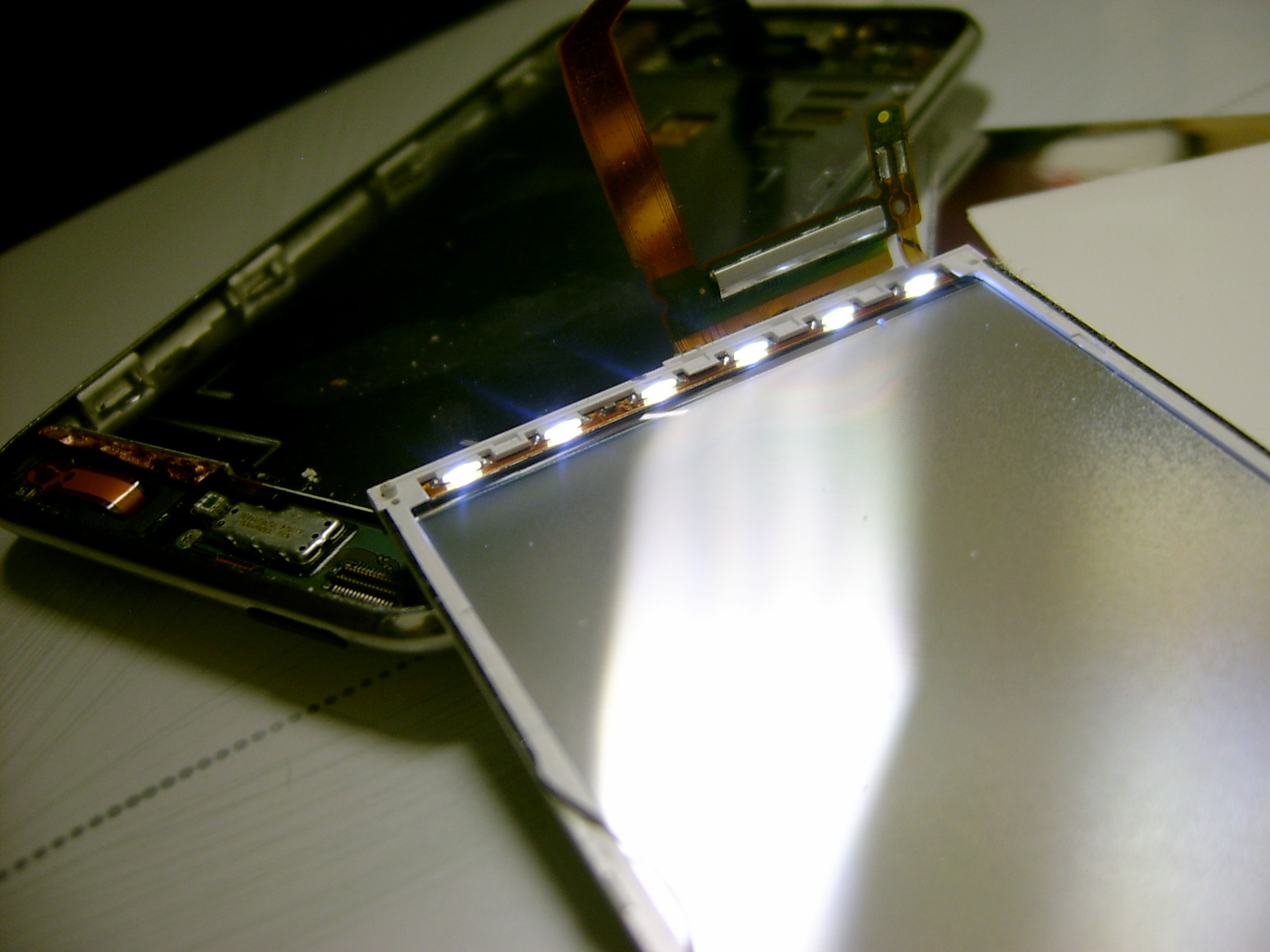
An Apple iPod Touch disassembled to show the array of white-edge LEDs powered on with the device

An LED-backlit LCD is a liquid-crystal display that uses light-emitting diodes (LED) for backlighting instead of cold cathode fluorescent lamps (CCFL). LED-backlit displays use the same TFT (thin-film transistor) LCD technologies as CCFL-backlit LCDs, but offer a variety of advantages over them. The LED bulbs are typically blue or white, but more recently RGB ones have been developed. There are four types of LED-backlit LCDs: Edge-Lit, Direct-Lit, Full-Array Local Dimming (FALD) and Mini-LED, each describing how the LED bulbs are arranged behind the liquid-crystal display for illumination. A variant is QLED, a type of LED-backlit LCD that uses an extra layer film of quantum dots for improved color gamut.

Televisions that use a combination of an LED backlight with an LCD panel are sometimes advertised as LED TVs, although they are not truly LED displays. They largely replaced CCFL-backlit LCD TVs in sales and manufacture by the early 2010s.

Backlit LCDs of any type cannot achieve true blacks for pixels, unlike the totally self-emissive OLED and MicroLED displays. This is because even in the "off" state, black pixels still allow some light from the backlight through. Some LED-backlit LCDs use local dimming zones to increase contrast between bright and dim areas of the display, but this can result in a "blooming" or "halo" effect on dark pixels in or adjacent to an illuminated zone.

== Comparison with CCFL-backlit LCDs ==
=== Advantages ===
When compared with earlier CCFL backlights, using LEDs for backlighting offers:

- Wider color gamut (with RGB-LED or QDEF) and dimming range
- Greater contrast ratio
- Very slim (some screens are less than 0.5 inches (13 mm) thin in edge-lit panels)
- Significantly lighter and cooler, as much as half the total chassis and system weight of a comparable CCFL
- Typically 20–30% lower power consumption and longer lifespan
- Greater reliability

=== Disadvantages ===
- Light is not evenly lit thus creating potential bright hot spots or dark patches on a screen

== LED arrangements ==
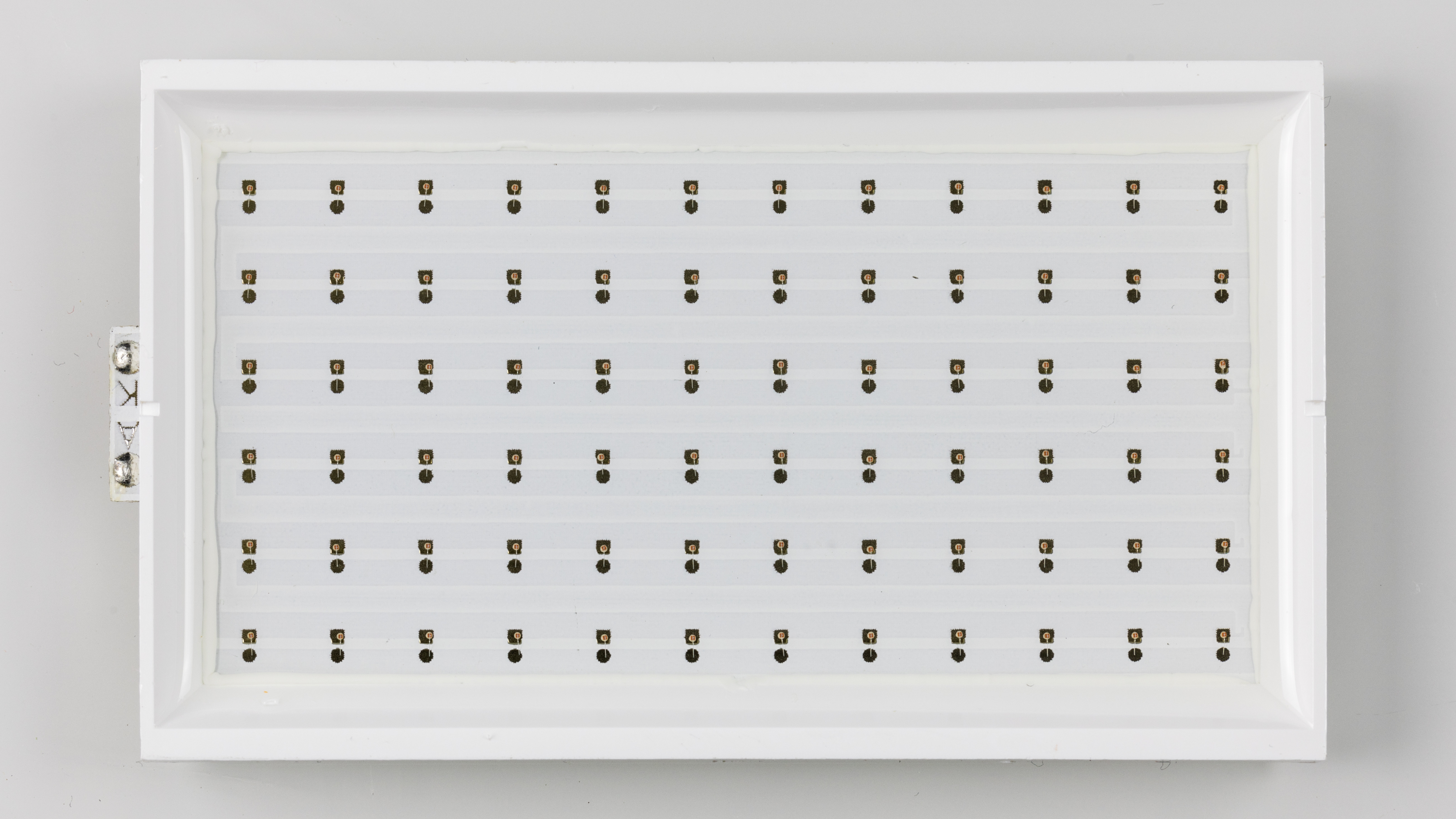
A single direct LED cluster of a LCD

LED backlights replace CCFL (fluorescent) lamps with a few to several hundred white, RGB or blue LEDs. An LCD with LED-Backlight may be edge- or direct-lit:

- edge-lit (ELED): LEDs form a line around the rim of the screen. May additionally support:
  - frame dimming: adjusts the brightness of the entire backlight based on the content displayed, as if local dimming was supported but only with a single zone
  - local dimming: multiple vertical or horizontal zones are individually controlled
- direct-lit (DLED) or full-array: LEDs form an array directly behind the screen at equally spaced intervals. May additionally support:
  - frame dimming: adjusts the brightness of the entire backlight based on the content displayed, as if local dimming was supported but only with a single zone
  - local dimming: multiple direct-lit LED clusters (rectangles) are individually controlled. Commonly referred to as Full Array Local Dimming (FALD).

Additionally a special diffusion panel (light guide plate, LGP) is often used to spread the light evenly behind the screen.

The local dimming method of backlighting allows to dynamically control the level of light intensity of specific areas of darkness on the screen, resulting in much higher dynamic-contrast ratios, though at the cost of less detail in small, bright objects on a dark background, such as star fields or shadow details.

A 2016 study by the University of California (Berkeley) suggests that the subjectively perceived visual enhancement with common contrast source material levels off at about 60 LCD local dimming zones.

In 2025 RTINGS.com found in accelerated longevity tests that edge-lit TVs were more prone to quicker failure than direct-lit panels (especially during non-stop usage) due to the heat of the LEDs being more concentrated and intense than direct-lit panels, making them more prone to panel cracking and warping and thus LED burnouts and failures.

== Technology ==
LED-backlit LCDs are not self-illuminating (unlike pure-LED systems). There are several methods of backlighting an LCD panel using LEDs, including the use of either white or RGB (Red, Green, and Blue) LED arrays behind the panel and edge-LED lighting (which uses white LEDs around the inside frame of the TV and a light-diffusion panel to spread the light evenly behind the LCD panel). Variations in LED backlighting offer different benefits. The first commercial full-array LED-backlit LCD TV was the Sony Qualia 005 (introduced in 2004), which used RGB LED arrays to produce a color gamut about twice that of a conventional CCFL LCD television. This was possible because red, green and blue LEDs have sharp spectral peaks which (combined with the LCD panel filters) result in significantly less bleed-through to adjacent color channels. Unwanted bleed-through channels do not "whiten" the desired color as much, resulting in a larger gamut. RGB LED technology continues to be used on Sony BRAVIA LCD models. LED backlighting using white LEDs produces a broader spectrum source feeding the individual LCD panel filters (similar to CCFL sources), resulting in a more limited display gamut than RGB LEDs at lower cost.

Using PWM (pulse-width modulation), a technology where the intensity of the LEDs are kept constant but the brightness adjustment is achieved by varying a time interval of flashing these constant light intensity light sources, the backlight is dimmed to the brightest color that appears on the screen while simultaneously boosting the LCD contrast to the maximum achievable levels, drastically increasing the perceived contrast ratio, increasing the dynamic range, improving the viewing angle dependency of the LCD and drastically reducing power consumption.

The prismatic and reflective polarization films are generally achieved using so called DBEF films manufactured and supplied by 3M. These reflective polarization films using uniaxial oriented polymerized liquid crystals (birefringent polymers or birefringent glue) were invented in 1989 by Philips researchers Dirk Broer, Adrianus de Vaan and Joerg Brambring.

The white LEDs in LED backlights may use special silicate phosphors, which are brighter but degrade faster. The size of the LEDs is one of the factors that determines the size of the bezel of LED-backlit LCDs.

Because LEDs can be switched on and off more quickly than CCFLs and can offer a higher light output, it is theoretically possible to offer very high contrast ratios. They can produce deep blacks (LEDs off) and high brightness (LEDs on). However, measurements made from pure-black and pure-white outputs are complicated by edge-LED lighting not allowing these outputs to be reproduced simultaneously on screen.

=== Power consumption and eco-credentials ===
The evolution of energy standards and the increasing public expectations regarding power consumption made it necessary for backlight systems to manage their power. As for other consumer electronics products (e.g., fridges or light bulbs), energy consumption categories are enforced for television sets. Standards for power ratings for TV sets have been introduced, e.g., in the US, EU, Australia, and China. A 2008 study showed that among European countries power consumption is one of the most important criteria for consumers when they choose a television, as important as the screen size.

LED-backlit LCDs have longer life and better energy efficiency than plasma and CCFL LCD TVs. Unlike CCFL backlights, LEDs do not use mercury in their manufacture, which is an environmental pollutant. However, other elements (such as gallium and arsenic) are used in the manufacture of the LED emitters; there is debate over whether they are a better long-term solution to the problem of screen disposal.

The combination of LED dynamic backlight control in combination with reflective polarizers and prismatic films (invented by Philips researchers Adrianus de Vaan and Paulus Schaareman make these "LED" (LCD) televisions far more efficient than the previous CRT-based sets, leading to a worldwide energy saving of 600 TWh in 2017, equal to 10% of the electricity consumption of all households worldwide, or twice the energy production of all solar cells in the world.

=== Methods ===
A first dynamic "local dimming" LED backlight was publicly demonstrated by BrightSide Technologies in 2003, and later commercially introduced for professional markets (such as video post-production). Edge LED lighting was first introduced by Sony in September 2008 on the 40-inch (1,000 mm) BRAVIA KLV-40ZX1M (known as the ZX1 in Europe). Edge-LED lighting for LCDs allows thinner housing; the Sony BRAVIA KLV-40ZX1M is 1 cm thick, and others are also extremely thin.

Full-array mini-LED backlights, consisting of several thousand WLEDs, were being researched for TVs and mobile devices in 2017.

==== Mini LED ====
Mini LED displays are LED-backlit LCDs that use thousands of miniature light-emitting diodes as the backlight source, enabling hundreds to thousands of full-array local dimming (FALD) zones. This offers improved contrast and deeper blacks compared with conventional LED-backlit LCDs.

Compared with OLED displays, Mini-LED LCDs can achieve higher sustained brightness and avoid burn-in, although they may still display slight blooming around bright highlights due to limited zone granularity.Picture quality also depends on the processing algorithms used to control the backlight; the effectiveness and response speed of these algorithms can affect contrast, haloing and transitions between illuminated zones. For example, LG’s Mini LED tv use their own Alpha series processors for image processing tasks such as upscaling and adjustments to contrast, brightness and image detail.

The technology was first commercialized in high end televisions in 2019, notably by TCL Technology, followed by other manufacturers including Samsung and LG. It has since been used in tablets and laptops: for example, the Apple 12.9-inch iPad Pro (2021) featured a “Liquid Retina XDR” Mini-LED panel with over 10,000 LEDs divided into 2,596 dimming zones, and LG's UltraGear evo GM9 (2026), branded "Hyper Mini LED," paired a 27-inch 5K panel with 9,216 LEDs across 2,304 dimming zones at up to 1,250 nits peak brightness.

Despite these advantages, Mini-LED displays remain more complex and expensive to manufacture than traditional LCDs, and uniform illumination across thousands of backlight segments presents ongoing manufacturing challenges.

==== RGB LED ====
Unlike conventional white or blue LED backlights, RGB backlights generate spectrally purer light with narrow band red, green, and blue spectrum, allowing the LCD to produce a wider color gamut and more accurate colors. This technology allows LCDs to provide increased brightness and color performance with various advanced LED technology.

TVs using an Micro RGB backlight have been released by Samsung and LG, whereas Hisense employs a larger variant called RGB Mini-LED. At CES 2026, TVs and computer monitors using RGB Mini-LED backlights were announced by LG, TCL, Hisense, and HKC.

LG uses Micro RGB technology in its pure RGB spectrum LCD televisions. The display received Triple 100% Color Certification from Intertak for its color accuracy standards. The system includes an alpha AI processor that runs image control algorithms to manage color and picture quality.

Despite the name, RGB Mini-LED and "Micro RGB" are not a self-emissive display technologies like MicroLED. These displays still rely on liquid crystal layers and do not offer pixel-level light control, as the light is modulated through the LCD matrix rather than emitted directly from each pixel.

=== Quantum dot enhancement film (QDEF) ===
Quantum dots are photoluminescent; they are useful in displays because they emit light in specific, narrow normal distributions of wavelengths. To generate white light best suited as an LCD backlight, parts of the light of a blue-emitting LED are transformed by quantum dots into small-bandwidth green and red light such that the combined white light allows a nearly ideal color gamut to be generated by the RGB color filters of the LCD panel. The quantum dots may be in a separate layer as a quantum dot enhancement film, or replace pigment-based green and red resists normally used in LCD color filters. In addition, efficiency is improved, as intermediate colors are no longer present and do not have to be filtered out by the color filters of the LCD screen. This can result in a display that more accurately renders colors in the visible spectrum. Companies developing quantum dot solutions for displays include Nanosys, 3M as a licensee of Nanosys, QD Vision of Lexington, Massachusetts, US and Avantama of Switzerland. This type of backlighting was demonstrated by various TV manufacturers at the Consumer Electronics Show 2015. Samsung introduced their first 'QLED' quantum dot displays at CES 2017 and later formed the 'QLED Alliance' with Hisense and TCL to market the technology.

== Backlight-dimming flicker ==
LED backlights are often dimmed by applying pulse-width modulation to the supply current, switching the backlight off and on more quickly than the eye can perceive. If the dimming-pulse frequency is too low or the user is sensitive to flicker, this may cause discomfort and eyestrain similar to the flicker of CRT displays at lower refresh rates. This can be tested by simply waving a hand in front of the screen; if it appears to have sharply defined edges as it moves, the backlight is pulsing at a fairly low frequency. If the hand appears blurry, the display either has a continuously illuminated backlight or is operating at a frequency too high to perceive. Flicker can be reduced (or eliminated) by setting the display to full brightness, although this can degrade image quality and increases power consumption.

As of 2025, most recently-made LED-backlit LCDs now use DC current regulation instead of pulse-width modulation to lower the brightness level, thus producing no flicker when the brightness setting is decreased; these are often marketed by the display manufacturer as being "flicker-free".

== Adoption ==
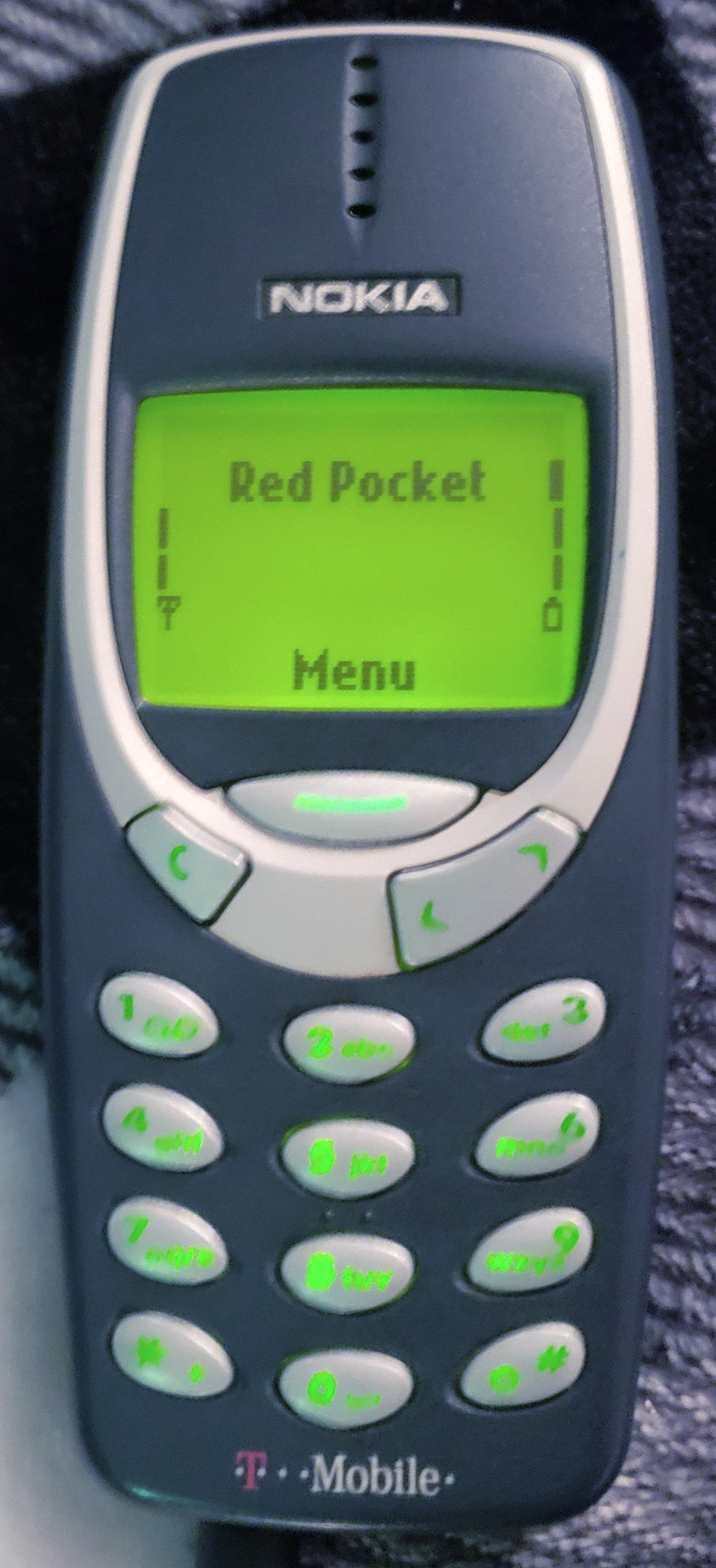
Single-color green LED backlighting on a low-power passive matrix LCD display of an old mobile phone

Small-screened monochrome laboratory instruments, in-car clocks, pagers and early mobile phones were some early uses of LCD products with LED backlighting, before technological advancements allowed its viable use in larger and color displays. The first commercial full-array LED-backlit LCD TV was the Sony Qualia 005 introduced in 2004. The technology was still new and this TV was of an ultra-luxury boutique tier.

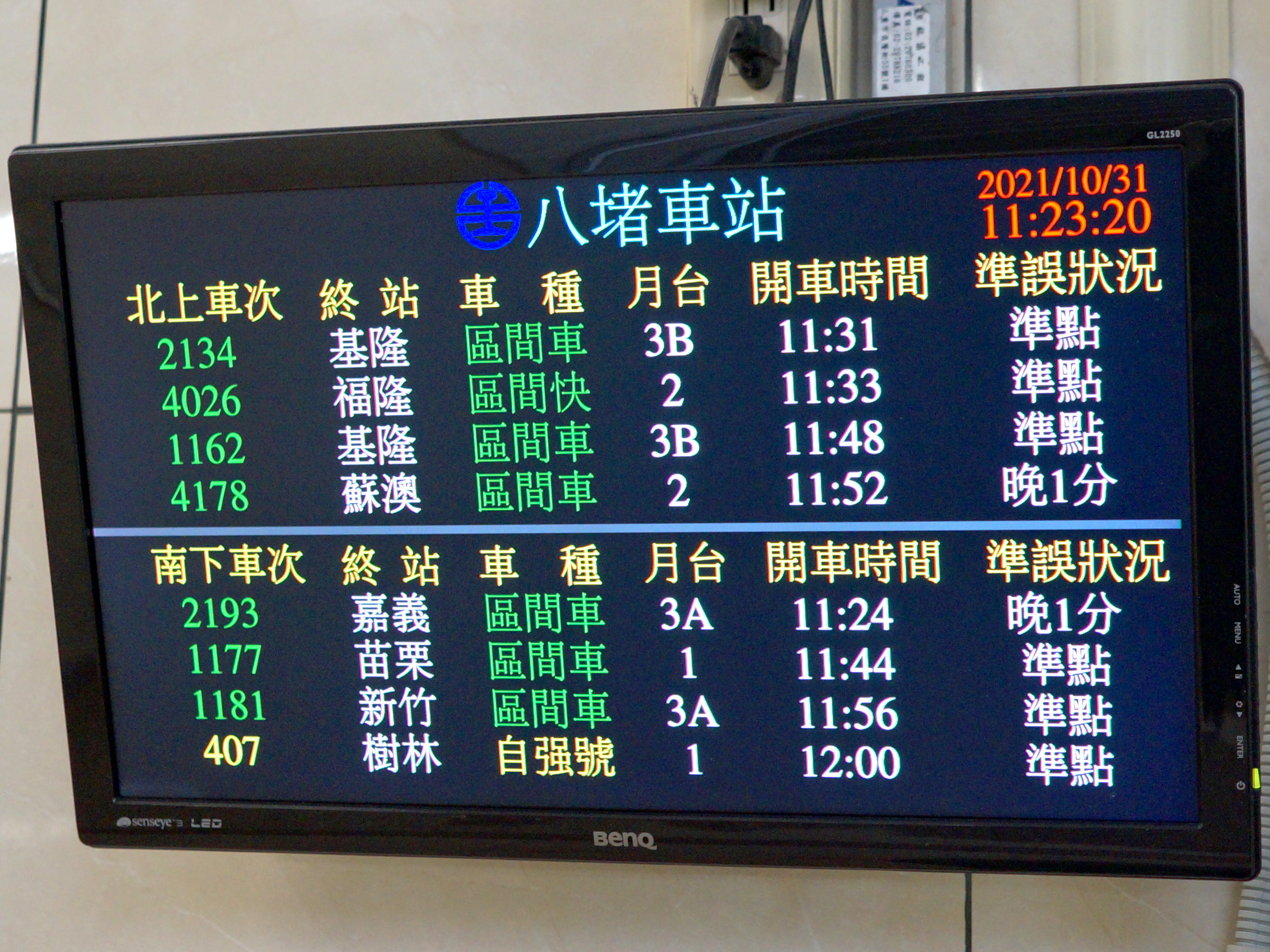
An LED-backlit color LCD monitor

LED backlighting was adopted in portable computers with the Sony VAIO TX series in 2005, Toshiba Portege R400 and MacBook Pro in 2007. LED-backlit LCD TVs was quickly adopted by the industry in about 2009 and falling prices meant that CCFL was not too long after replaced across most manufacturers' product ranges. Television sets described as "LED TVs" are LCD-based, with the LEDs dynamically controlled using the video information (dynamic backlight control or dynamic "local dimming" LED backlight, also marketed as HDR, high dynamic range television, invented by Philips researchers Douglas Stanton, Martinus Stroomer and Adrianus de Vaan

== See also ==
- Uniformity tape
