= Quantum dot display =

Type of display device

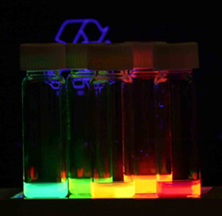
Colloidal quantum dots irradiated with an Ultraviolet light. Different sized quantum dots emit different color light due to quantum confinement.

A quantum dot display is a display device that uses quantum dots (QDs), semiconductor nanocrystals which can produce pure monochromatic (Note: Up to the specified bandwidth, which is in turn a function of the dispersity of the quantum dots) red, green, and blue light.

QDs are either photo-emissive (photoluminescent) or electro-emissive (electroluminescent) allowing them to be readily incorporated into new emissive display architectures. Quantum dots naturally produce monochromatic light, so they are more efficient than white light sources when color filtered and allow more saturated colors that reach nearly 100% of Rec. 2020 color gamut.

As of June 2025, all commercial products, such as LCD TVs branded as QLED, employ quantum dots as photo-emissive particles; electro-emissive QD-LED TVs exist in laboratories only.

LED-backlit LCDs are the main application of photo-emissive quantum dots, though it is applicable to other display technologies that use color filters, such as blue/UV organic light-emitting diode (OLED), MicroLED, or QNED display panels. QD-OLED displays, which use blue OLED panels with QD color filters, started coming to market in 2023. QD-OLED and QD-LED displays can achieve the same contrast as OLED and MicroLED displays with "perfect" black levels in the off state, unlike LED-backlit LCDs.

== Working principle ==
The idea of using quantum dots as a light source emerged in the 1990s. Early applications included imaging using QD infrared photodetectors, light emitting diodes and single-color light emitting devices. Starting in the early 2000s, scientists started to realize the potential of developing quantum dots for light sources and displays.

Photo-emissive quantum dot particles are used in LCD backlights or display color filters. Quantum dots are excited by the blue light from the display panel to emit pure basic colors, which reduces light losses and color crosstalk in color filters, improving display brightness and color gamut. Light travels through QD layer film and traditional RGB filters made from color pigments or through QD filters with red/green QD color converters and blue passthrough.

Electro-emissive or electroluminescent quantum dot displays are an experimental type of display based on quantum-dot light-emitting diodes (QD-LED; also EL-QLED, ELQD, QDEL). These displays are similar to AMOLED and MicroLED screens because each pixel produces its own light when an electric current is applied to tiny inorganic particles. Manufacturers asserted that QD-LED displays could support large, flexible displays and would not degrade as readily as OLEDs, making them good candidates for flat-panel TV screens, digital cameras, mobile phones, and handheld game consoles.

== Technology ==
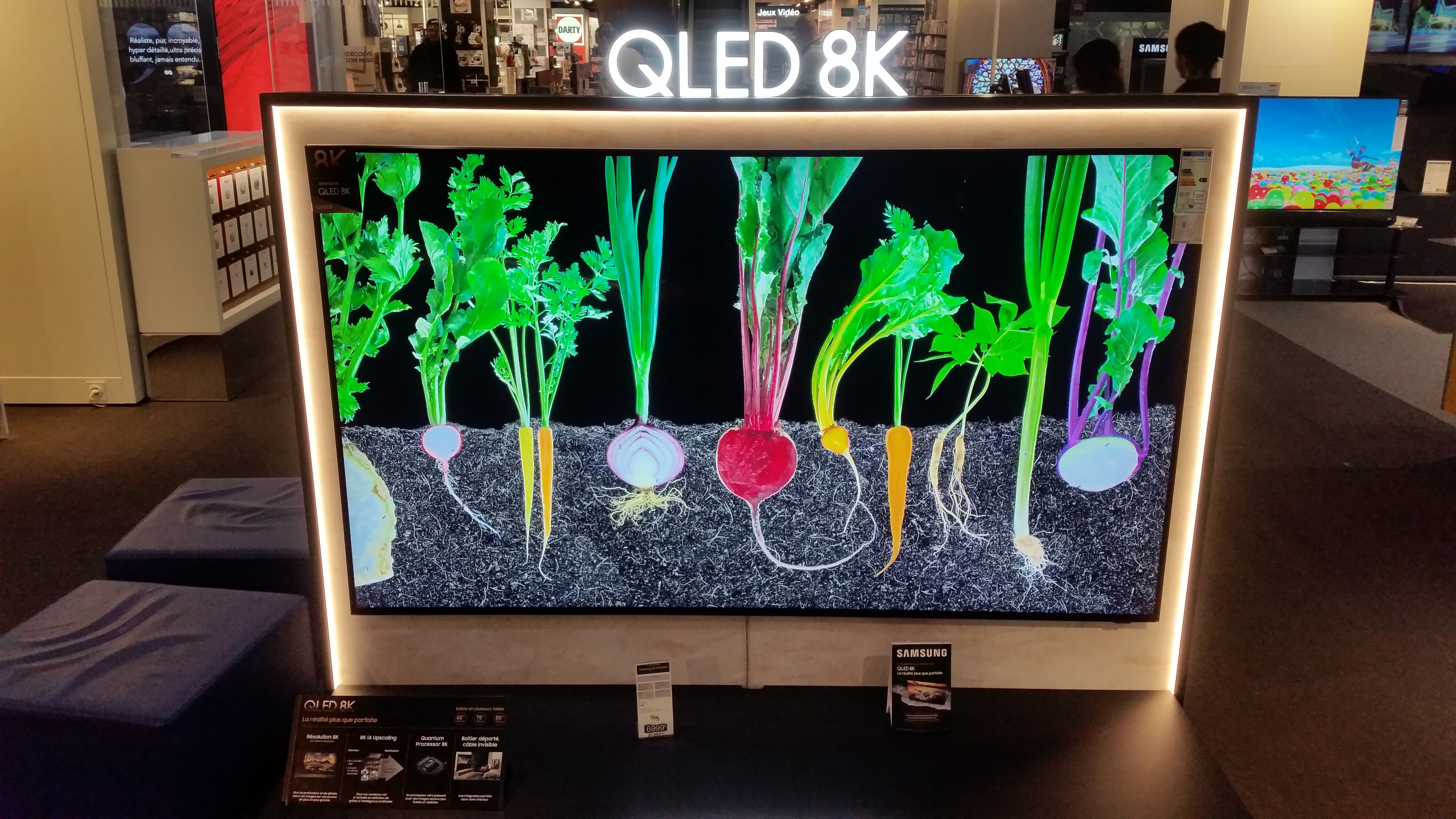
Samsung QLED TV 8K - 75 inches

=== Quantum dot enhancement film ===
A widespread practical application is using quantum dot enhancement film (QDEF) layer to improve the LED backlighting in LCD TVs. Light from a blue LED backlight is converted by QDs to relatively pure red and green, so that this combination of blue, green and red light incurs less blue-green crosstalk and light absorption in the color filters after the LCD screen, thereby increasing useful light throughput and providing a better color gamut.

The first manufacturer shipping TVs of this kind was Sony in 2013 as Triluminos, Sony's trademark for the technology. At the Consumer Electronics Show 2015, Samsung Electronics, TCL Corporation and Sony showed QD-enhanced LED-backlighting of LCD TVs. At the CES 2017, Samsung rebranded their 'SUHD' TVs as 'QLED'; later in April 2017, Samsung formed the QLED Alliance with Hisense and TCL to produce and market QD-enhanced TVs.

Quantum dot on glass (QDOG) replaces QD film with a thin QD layer coated on top of the light-guide plate (LGP), reducing costs and improving efficiency.

Traditional white LED backlights that use blue LEDs with on-chip or on-rail red-green QD structures are being researched since 2010s, though high operating temperatures negatively affect their lifespan.

=== Quantum dot color converter ===
==== LCD ====
QD color converter (QDCC) LED-backlit LCDs would use QD film or ink-printed QD layer with red/green sub-pixel patterned (i.e. aligned to precisely match the red and green subpixels) quantum dots to produce pure red/green light; blue subpixels can be transparent to pass through the pure blue LED backlight, or can be made with blue patterned quantum dots in case of UV-LED backlight. This configuration effectively replaces passive color filters, which incur substantial losses by filtering out 2/3 of passing light, with photo-emissive QD structures, improving power efficiency and/or peak brightness, and enhancing color purity.

Because quantum dots depolarize the light, output polarizer (the analyzer) needs to be moved behind the color converter and embedded in-cell of the LCD glass; this would improve viewing angles as well. In-cell arrangement of the analyzer and/or the polarizer would also reduce depolarization effects in the LC layer, increasing contrast ratio. To reduce self-excitement of QD film and to improve efficiency, the ambient light can be blocked using traditional color filters, and reflective polarizers can direct light from the QDCC towards the viewer. As only blue or UV light passes through the liquid crystal layer, it can be made thinner, resulting in faster pixel response times.

Nanosys made presentations of their photo-emissive color converter technology during 2017; commercial products were expected by 2019, though in-cell polarizer remained a major challenge. As of December 2019, issues with in-cell polarizer remained unresolved and no LCDs with QD color converter appeared on the market since then.

==== QD-OLED ====
QD color converters can be used with OLED or micro-LED panels, improving their efficiency and color gamut. QD-OLED panels with blue emitters and red-green color converters have been researched by Samsung and TCL. In October 2019, Samsung Display announced an investment of $10.8 billion in both research and production, with the aim to convert all their 8G panel factories to QD-OLED production during 2019–2025. Samsung Display presented 55" and 65" QD-OLED panels at CES 2022, with TVs from Samsung Electronics and Sony to be released later in 2022.

QD-OLED displays show better color volume, covering 90% of Rec.2020 color gamut with peak brightness of 1500 nits, while current OLED and LCD TVs cover 70–75% of Rec.2020 (95–100% of DCI-P3).

==== QNED ====
A further development of QD-OLED displays is quantum dot nanorod emitting diode (QNED) display which replaces blue OLED layer with InGaN/GaN blue nanorod LEDs. Nanorods have a larger emitting surface compared to planar LED, allowing increased efficiency and higher light emission. Nanorod solution is ink-printed on the substrate, then subpixels are aligned in-place by electric current, and QD color converters are placed on top of red/green subpixels. Samsung Display was expected to begin test production of QNED panels in 2021, with mass production in 2024–2025, but test production has been postponed as of May 2022.

==== microLED ====
An QD chip-on-board (QD-COB) color conversion layer can be applied to microLED microdisplays commonly used in near-eye devices such as augmented reality (AR) glasses and micro projectors. Two main color conversion technologies have been developed: one embeds quantum dots in nanoporous GaN on blue LEDs (e.g., Nanopore Quantum Dot, or NPQD), and the other uses patterned quantum dot photoresist layers over the microLED array. These approaches enable extremely high pixel densities and sufficient brightness for compact full-color displays. The NPQD process creates an in-situ nanoporous layer on a GaN microLED wafer, which is filled with quantum dots to convert blue emission into red or green light, enabling monolithic full-color displays with improved brightness, efficiency, and reliability. By replacing conventional AlInGaP-based red light-emitting chips—which differ in material composition from green and blue InGaN chips—with quantum dot-converted red subpixels, QD-COB displays demonstrate improved color consistency across a range of viewing angles. Commercial 0.22-inch microLED displays with a QD-COB layer were released in 2023-2024, with 0.39-inch and a 0.13-inch versions targeting pilot production in 2025.

Additional experimental methods, such as inkjet printing of QD inks, are also under investigation for micron-scale integration.

=== Self-emissive quantum dot diodes ===
Self-emissive quantum dot displays will use electroluminescent QD nanoparticles functioning as Quantum-dot-based LEDs (QD-LED) arranged in either active matrix or passive matrix array. Rather than requiring a separate LED backlight for illumination and TFT LCD to control the brightness of color primaries, these QDEL displays would natively control the light emitted by individual color subpixels, greatly reducing pixel response times by eliminating the liquid crystal layer. This technology has also been called true QLED display, and electroluminescent quantum dots (ELQD, QDEL, EL-QLED).

The structure of a QD-LED is similar to the basic design of an OLED. The major difference is that the light emitting devices are quantum dots, such as cadmium selenide (CdSe) nanocrystals. A layer of quantum dots is sandwiched between layers of electron-transporting and hole-transporting organic materials. An applied electric field causes electrons and holes to move into the quantum dot layer, where they are captured in the quantum dot and recombine, emitting photons. The demonstrated color gamut from QD-LEDs exceeds the performance of both LCD and OLED display technologies. To realize all-QD LED, the challenge that should be overcome is the currently poor electrical conduction in the emitting QD layers.

As cadmium-based materials cannot be used in lighting applications due to their environmental impact, InP (indium phosphide) ink-jet solutions are being researched by Nanosys, Nanoco, Nanophotonica, OSRAM OLED, Fraunhofer IAP, Merck, and Seoul National University, among others. As of 2019, InP based materials are still not yet ready for commercial production due to limited lifetime.

Mass production of active-matrix QLED displays using ink-jet printing was expected to begin in 2020–2021, but as of 2024, longevity issues are not resolved and the technology remains in prototyping stage. In 2024, Nanosys assumed their QD electroluminescent technology to be available for production by 2026, and in 2026, to appear by 2029.

At CES 2024, Sharp NEC Display privately demonstrated prototypes of 12" and 30" display panels.

== Commercial products ==
A variety of brands sell displays that combine an LED-backlit LCD with a quantum dot film to improve color and contrast compared to regular LED-backlit displays. Sony promotes their QD-enhanced products as Triluminos. Samsung promotes their QD products as QLED and has allowed Hisense and TCL to promote theirs in the same way. Starting in 2021 LG Electronics introduced a series of TVs branded as "QNED Mini LED". These TVs are based on LCD displays with mini LED backlighting and don't use self-emissive technologies.

Some brands, such as Samsung, sell QD-OLED displays that combine an OLED panel with Quantum dot color converters to improve color and brightness compared to regular OLED displays; these typically use blue OLED layers instead of RGB or RGBW.

Tests commissioned in 2024 by Hansol, a supplier for Samsung Electronics, suggest that several TCL models marketed as containing quantum dots do not actually contain quantum dot materials. However, news outlets warn readers to be skeptical of Hansol's claims due to their ties with one of TCL's competitors. In March 2026, Samsung Electronics' law firm Pinsent Masons stated that it had won a misleading-advertising case against TCL Deutschland before the Landgericht München I concerning TCL televisions advertised as "QLED". According to the firm, the court barred TCL from continuing to market the challenged models from six series as "QLED" and ordered it to correct the statements; the judgment was not yet final.

== Optical properties of quantum dots ==
Performance of QDs is determined by the size and/or composition of the QD structures. Unlike simple atomic structures, a quantum dot structure has the unusual property that energy levels are strongly dependent on the structure's size. For example, CdSe quantum dot light emission can be tuned from red (5 nm diameter) to the violet region (1.5 nm dot). The physical reason for QD coloration is the quantum confinement effect and is directly related to their energy levels. The bandgap energy that determines the energy (and hence color) of the fluorescent light is inversely proportional to the square of the size of quantum dot. Larger QDs have more energy levels that are more closely spaced, allowing the QD to emit (or absorb) photons of lower energy (redder color). In other words, the emitted photon energy increases as the dot size decreases, because greater energy is required to confine the semiconductor excitation to a smaller volume.

Newer quantum dot structures employ indium, instead of cadmium, as the latter is not exempted for use in lighting by the European Commission RoHS directive, and also because of cadmium's toxicity. Indium phosphide quantum dots specifically have emerged as a promising alternative to cadmium-based quantum dots for luminescence in the visible range.

QD-LEDs are characterized by pure and saturated emission colors with narrow bandwidth, with FWHM (full width at half maximum) in the range of 20–40 nm. Their emission wavelength is easily tuned by changing the size of the quantum dots. Moreover, QD-LED offer high color purity and durability combined with the efficiency, flexibility, and low processing cost of comparable organic light-emitting devices. QD-LED structure can be tuned over the entire visible wavelength range from 460 nm (blue) to 650 nm (red) (the human eye can detect light from 380 to 750 nm). The emission wavelengths have been continuously extended to UV and NIR range by tailoring the chemical composition of the QDs and device structure.

== Fabrication process ==
Quantum dots are solution processable and suitable for wet processing techniques. The two major fabrication techniques for QD-LED are called phase separation and contact-printing.

=== Phase separation ===
Phase separation is suitable for forming large-area ordered QD monolayers. A single QD layer is formed by spin casting a mixed solution of QD and an organic semiconductor such as TPD (N,N′-Bis(3-methylphenyl)-N,N′-diphenylbenzidine). This process simultaneously yields QD monolayers self-assembled into hexagonally close-packed arrays and places this monolayer on top of a co-deposited contact. During solvent drying, the QDs phase separate from the organic under-layer material (TPD) and rise towards the film's surface. The resulting QD structure is affected by many parameters: solution concentration, solvent ration, QD size distribution and QD aspect ratio. Also important is QD solution and organic solvent purity.

Although phase separation is relatively simple, it is not suitable for display device applications. Since spin-casting does not allow lateral patterning of different sized QDs (RGB), phase separation cannot create a multi-color QD-LED. Moreover, it is not ideal to have an organic under-layer material for a QD-LED; an organic under-layer must be homogeneous, a constraint which limits the number of applicable device designs.

=== Contact printing ===
The contact printing process for forming QD thin films is a solvent-free water-based suspension method, which is simple and cost efficient with high throughput. During the process, the device structure is not exposed to solvents. Since charge transport layers in QD-LED structures are solvent-sensitive organic thin films, avoiding solvent during the process is a major benefit. This method can produce RGB patterned electroluminescent structures with 1000 ppi (pixels-per-inch) resolution.

The overall process of contact printing:

- Polydimethylsiloxane (PDMS) is molded using a silicon master.
- Top side of resulting PDMS stamp is coated with a thin film of Parylene-c, a chemical-vapor deposited (CVD) aromatic organic polymer.
- Parylene-c coated stamp is inked via spin-casting of a solution of colloidal QDs suspended in an organic solvent.
- After the solvent evaporates, the formed QD monolayer is transferred to the substrate by contact printing.

The array of quantum dots is manufactured by self-assembly in a process known as spin casting: a solution of quantum dots in an organic material is poured onto a substrate, which is then set spinning to spread the solution evenly.

Contact printing allows fabrication of multi-color QD-LEDs. A QD-LED was fabricated with an emissive layer consisting of 25-μm wide stripes of red, green and blue QD monolayers. Contact printing methods also minimize the amount of QD required, reducing costs.

== Comparison ==
Nanocrystal displays would render as much as a 30% increase in the visible spectrum, while using 30 to 50% less power than LCDs, in large part because nanocrystal displays would not need backlighting. QD LEDs are 50–100 times brighter than CRT and LC displays, emitting 40,000 nits (cd/m^{2}). QDs are dispersable in both aqueous and non-aqueous solvents, which provides for printable and flexible displays of all sizes, including large area TVs. QDs can be inorganic, offering the potential for improved lifetimes compared to OLED (however, since many parts of QD-LED are often made of organic materials, further development is required to improve the functional lifetime.) In addition to OLED displays, pick-and-place microLED displays are emerging as competing technologies to nanocrystal displays. Samsung has developed a method for making self-emissive quantum dot diodes with a lifetime of 1 million hours.

Other advantages include better saturated green colors, manufacturability on polymers, thinner display and the use of the same material to generate different colors.

One disadvantage is that blue quantum dots require highly precise timing control during the reaction, because blue quantum dots are just slightly above the minimum size. Since sunlight contains roughly equal luminosities of red, green and blue across the entire spectrum, a display also needs to produce roughly equal luminosities of red, green and blue to achieve pure white as defined by CIE Standard Illuminant D65. However, the blue component in the display can have relatively lower color purity and/or precision (dynamic range) in comparison to green and red, because the human eye is three to five times less sensitive to blue in daylight conditions according to CIE luminosity function.

In contrast to traditional LCD panels and Quantum Dot LCD panels, QD-OLEDs suffer from the same screen burn-in effect as normal OLED panels.

== See also ==
- Bandwidth (signal processing)
- Electron hole
- Energy level
- Nanotechnology
- Organic light-emitting diode
- Potential well
- Quantum dot
- Spectral linewidth
