= Hongxing Jiang =

Chinese-American physicist

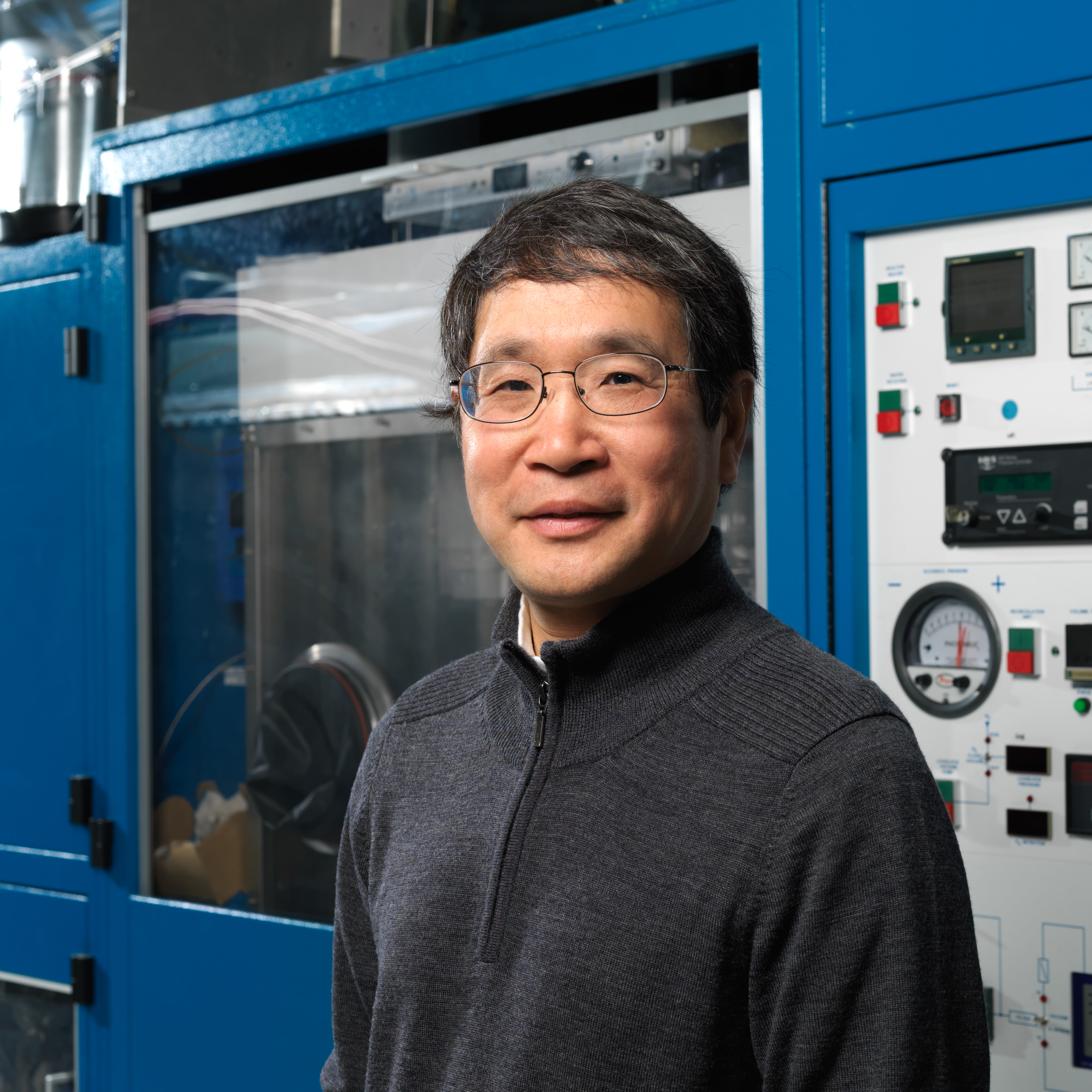
Hongxing Jiang

Hongxing Jiang (Chinese: 江红星) is a Chinese-American physicist and engineer working in the field of wide bandgap semiconductors and photonic devices. He is the original inventor of MicroLED. In 2000, the research team led by Hongxing Jiang and Jingyu Lin (Chinese: 林景瑜) at Kansas State University (KSU) realized the operation of the first MicroLED and passive driving MicroLED microdisplay. In 2009, he and his colleagues at III-N Technology, Inc. (3N) and Texas Tech University (TTU) patented and realized the first active driving high-resolution and video-capable microLED microdisplay in VGA format (640 x 480 pixels) via heterogeneous integration of MicroLED array with CMOS active-matrix driver and the work was published in the following years.

The single-chip high-voltage DC/AC LEDs via on-chip integration of mini- and MicroLED arrays developed by their team in 2002 have been widely commercialized for general solid-state lighting and automobile headlights.

Under the support of DARPA-MTO’s SUVOS, CMUVT, DUVAP, and VIGIL programs, their research team has contributed to the early developments of III-nitride deep UV emitters and detectors and InGaN energy devices in the United States. These include the development of the first deep UV picosecond time-resolved optical spectroscopy system (down to 195 nm) for characterizing ultrawide bandgap (UWBG) semiconductor materials, the first prediction and confirmation that Al-rich AlGaN deep UV emitters emit light in the transverse-magnetic (TM) mode, the demonstration of the first UV/blue photonic crystal LED (PC-LED), and AlN deep UV avalanche detectors with an ultrahigh specific detectivity. His team was also one of the first to determine the Mg acceptor energy level in AlN optically and electrically and to demonstrate the conductivity control in Al-rich AlGaN. Supported by ARPA-E, their research team has developed crystal growth technologies for producing thick epitaxial films (or quasi-bulk crystals) of hexagonal boron nitride (h-BN) UWBG semiconductor in large wafer sizes and realized h-BN thermal neutron detectors with a record high detection efficiency.

While in graduate school at Syracuse University (SU), Hongxing Jiang and Jingyu Lin developed the first analytical formalism based on Newtonian gravitational force to describe the orbit of a star moving into and out of a galaxy and predicated the phenomenon of mass precession. This effect has been used by astrophysicists to constrain the abundance of dark matter in the Solar System and the Galactic Center.

== Education ==
He obtained PhD in physics in 1986 from Syracuse University under the guidance of Arnold Honig. He received his BS in physics in 1981 from Fudan University, China. He came to US for graduate studies through the CUSPEA program.

== Career ==
He has been working on III-nitride wide bandgap semiconductors since 1995. Currently, he is a co-director of the Nanophotonics Center and the inaugural Edward E. Whitacre Jr. endowed chair and Horn Distinguished Professor of Electrical & Computer Engineering within the Edward E. Whitacre Jr. College of Engineering at Texas Tech University (TTU). To be designated a Horn Professor is the highest honor received by a Texas Tech faculty member. In 2008, he relocated his research group to TTU from Kansas State University where he was a University Distinguished Professor of Physics.

== Awards ==
- Recipient of “Global SSL Award of Outstanding Achievements” 2021 for his invention of microLED, awarded by the International SSL (Solid-State Lighting) Alliance (ISA)
- Elected Fellow of the National Academy of Inventors for the invention and development of microLED, 2018
- Fellow of the American Association for the Advancement of Science, 2016
- Fellow of SPIE - the international society for optics and photonics, 2015
- Fellow of the Optical Society of America, 2014
- Fellow of the American Physical Society, 2010
