= C Seed 262 =

262-inch 4K UHD LED TV

C SEED 262 is a 262-inch 4K UHD LED television set developed by C SEED Entertainment Systems and launched June 2017. C SEED Entertainment Systems is a specialized prime electronics company which brought on the market products such as C SEED 201 and C SEED 125.

== Featuresа ==
C SEED 262 features a customized fabric cover that will fold away when the viewing starts and cover the screen when the TV is turned off. C SEED 262 includes a 4K media server and through the ultra-high 800 nits brightness allows viewing in daylight conditions. The integrated speakers are configured for a cinema surround experience.

== Physical dimensions ==
LED TV Size diagonal: 262 inch/6,655 mm

LED TV Size width: 242 inch/6,144 mm

LED TV Size height: 101 inch/2,574 mm

LED TV Size depth: 4.3 inch/110 mm

LED TV Weight: 798 kg

== Technical data ==
- Brightness: 800nits
- Pixel Pitch: 1.5 mm
- Pixel resolution: 4,096 (width) x 1,716 (height)
- Display aspect ratio: 2.39:1 (1024:429)
- Format: DCI 4K (CinemaScope cropped)
- Number of SMD LEDs: 7,028,736
- Processing depth: 281 trillion colors
- Refresh rate: 2,880 Hz
- Lifespan: 100,000 h
- Broadband speaker peak out: 6 x 250 W

== External websites ==
- Official website
