= Jingyu Lin =

Chinese-American physicist and engineer

- 林景瑜
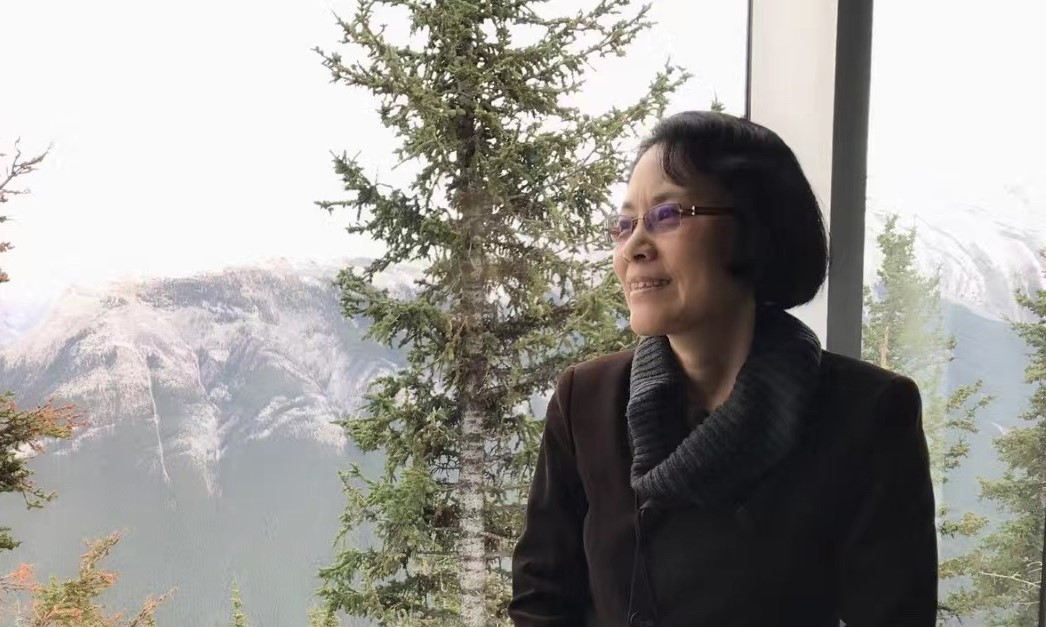
- Jingyu Lin, 2024
- Born: China
- Education: Syracuse University
- Board member of: National Academy of Inventors, fellow (2019); American Association for the Advancement of Science, fellow (2018); SPIE - the International Society for Optics and Photonics, fellow (2017); Optical Society of America, fellow (2016); American Physical Society, fellow (2012)
- Spouse: Hongxing Jiang
- Engineering career
- Discipline: Physics
- Institutions: Texas Tech University
- Projects: Co-inventor of MicroLED
- Significant design: Single-chip high-voltage DC/AC LEDs
- Awards: Horn Distinguished Professor, Texas Tech University (2014 – present); Barnie E. Rushing, Jr. Faculty Distinguished Research Award, TTU (2014); NSF Career Advancement Award (1994); Senate Research Award, Syracuse University (1986)
- Website: www.depts.ttu.edu/ece/faculty/jingyu_lin/index.php

Jingyu Lin (Chinese: 林景瑜) is a Chinese-American physicist and engineer working in the field of wide bandgap semiconductors and photonic devices. She is a co-inventor of MicroLED. In 2000, the husband-wife research team led by Hongxing Jiang and Jingyu Lin at Kansas State University (KSU) proposed and realized the operation of the first MicroLED and passive driving MicroLED microdisplay. In 2009, their team and colleagues at III-N Technology, Inc. and Texas Tech University (TTU) realized and patented the first active driving MicroLED microdisplay in VGA format by heterogeneously integrating MicroLED array with Si CMOS active-matrix driver.

The single-chip high-voltage DC/AC LEDs via on-chip integration of mini- and MicroLED arrays developed by their team in 2002 have been widely commercialized for general solid-state lighting and automobile headlights.

Under the support of DARPA-MTO’s SUVOS, CMUVT, DUVAP, and VIGIL programs, their research team contributed to the early developments of III-nitride deep UV emitters and detectors and InGaN energy devices in the United States. These include the prediction and confirmation that Al-rich AlGaN deep UV emitters emit light in the transverse-magnetic (TM) mode, the demonstration of the first UV and blue photonic crystal LEDs (PC-LEDs), one of the first to demonstrate conductivity control in Al-rich AlGaN and AlN deep UV avalanche photodetectors with an ultrahigh specific detectivity. Supported by ARPA-E, their research team has developed crystal growth technologies for producing thick epitaxial films (or quasi-bulk crystals) of hexagonal boron nitride (h-BN) ultrawide bandgap semiconductor in large wafer sizes and realized h-BN thermal neutron detectors with a record high detection efficiency.

== Education ==
Jingyu Lin obtained PhD in physics in 1989 from Syracuse University under the guidance Arnold Honig. She received her BS in physics in 1983 from SUNY Oneonta.

== Career ==
Currently, she is a co-director of the Nanophotonics Center and is the inaugural Linda F. Whitacre endowed chair and Horn Distinguished Professor of Electrical & Computer Engineering within the Edward E. Whitacre Jr. College of Engineering at Texas Tech University (TTU). To be designated a Horn Professor is the highest honor received by a Texas Tech faculty member. In 2008, she along with her husband Hongxing Jiang (a Horn Distinguished Professor, co-director of the Nanophotonics Center and the inaugural Edward Whitacre endowed chair at TTU), relocated their research team to TTU from Kansas State University where she was a professor of physics.

== Honors and awards ==
Elected fellow of the National Academy of Inventors, 2019

Elected fellow of the American Association for the Advancement of Science, 2018

Elected fellow of the SPIE - the international society for optics and photonics, 2017

Elected fellow of the Optical Society of America, 2016

Elected fellow of the American Physical Society, 2012
