= Qualia (disambiguation) =

Qualia is a term used in philosophy to refer to subjective conscious experiences.

Qualia may also refer to:

- Qualia (Sony), a series of electronic products produced by Sony
- Qualia (album), a 2008 album by Japanese rock band Jinn
- "Qualia" (song), a 2010 single by Japanese rock band Uverworld
- Qualia the Purple, a 2009 Japanese light novel

== See also ==
- Qualis (disambiguation)
