= C SEED 201 =

201-inch MicroLED outdoor TV

C SEED Entertainment Systems, founded in 2009 by Alexander Swatek along with Jakob Odgaard and Jorn Sterup, specializes in luxury, foldable outdoor and indoor MicroLED televisions. The company is known for its high-tech innovations in electronic entertainment systems, combining minimalistic design with advanced technology. Headquartered in Vienna, Austria, with a branch in Los Angeles, C SEED focuses on creating groundbreaking audiovisual experiences for luxury homes and yachts. The leadership team includes industry veterans with extensive experience in display technology and high-end electronics.

== History ==
The development of C SEED lasted four years and was done by R&D engineers at C SEED Entertainment Systems in Austria and by the engineering team of Porsche Design Studio in Germany. C SEED has been on the market since 2011 and won the Red Dot design award "Best of the Best 2012".

== TV Features ==
Kinematic

The C SEED is hidden in its underground storage casing waiting for its activation by a simple push of a button on the remote control. After activation, the C SEED 201 column takes 15 seconds to achieve its full height of 4.65 m (15 ft.) with effortless ease. Seven massive LED panels unfold equally soundlessly within the next 25 seconds. The screen can rotate up to 270 degrees and can be raised or lowered to the optimal height for optimum viewing comfort. With a diagonal of 201 inches (5.11 meters) the display of the C SEED 201 is not only the world's largest TV display but, by using 2,963,520 MicroLEDs it's ten times brighter than a usual TV display too. This enables watching TV in any daylight environment, including direct sunshine.

Sound

The sound system comprises 6 broadband speakers for the left and right audio channels, and 1 subwoofer for low frequencies. The speakers deliver distortion-free sound under all weather conditions.

Multi-source media server

At the core of the TV-system there is a multi-source media server that transfers HD video.

Environmental sensor

The system is equipped with wind, temperature and laser sensors in order to prevent getting damaged through adverse outdoor conditions.

== Technical data ==
- 201 inch TV with 2,963,520 MicroLEDs
- LED TV technology with max. 4.000 nits brightness / fully daylight compatible
- 6 speakers and 1 subwoofer
- Waterproof
- Rotatable through 270 degrees
- Wireless 2.4 GHz remote control
