= Crystal LED =

Screen manufacturing technique

Crystal LED (CLED) refers to a screen manufacturing technique. It was invented by Sony and revealed at CES 2012.

== Overview ==
This technology makes use of light emitting diodes mounted on each segment RGB of the display, such that each pixel is illuminated independently. This makes it the first "true" LED television.

== History ==
=== 2012 ===
Sony unveiled Crystal LED display technology in the CES 2012.

The following year, the company was deciding between CLED and OLED, and did not display CLED at the 2013 CES, but produced an OLED instead.

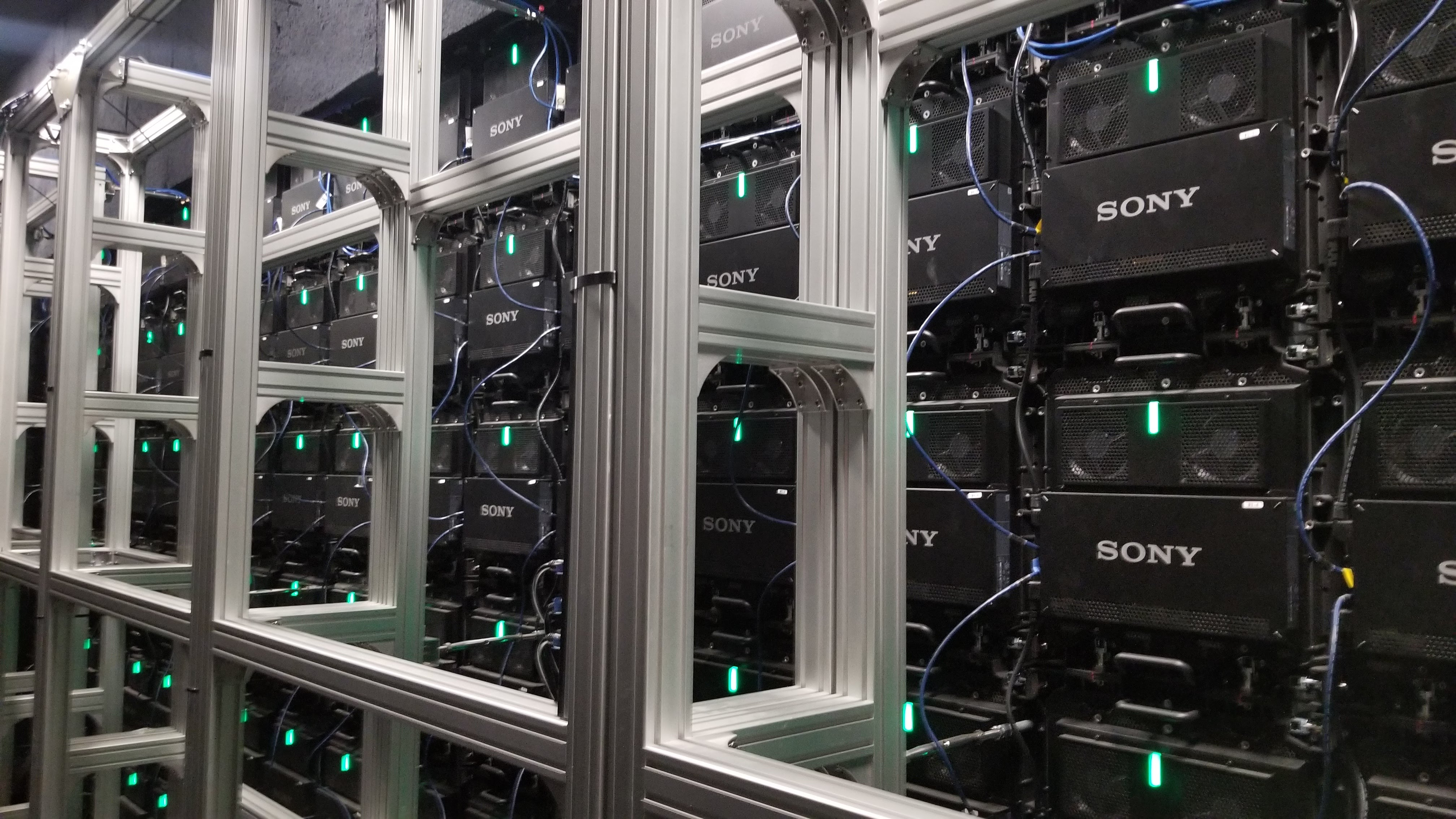
The rear view of a CLEDIS installation, showing the individual modules mounted in a grid.

=== 2017 ===
At CES 2017 Sony showcased the CLEDIS ™ (Crystal LED Integrated Structure) with a Crystal LED video wall approximately 32 by 9 feet (9.7 x 2.7 meter) with a resolution of 8000 x 2000 pixel. According to Sony, it is composed of single display modules measuring 17 7/8" (463.6mm) by 15 7/8" (403.2mm) each.

The individual modules were not visible to the human eye. Due to the modular structure of the system theoretically, any resolution and size could be possible according to a Sony representative.

== See also ==
- LED
- MicroLED
- OLED
