= Uniformity tape =

Uniformity tape is a microstructured thin-film mechanism for mixing and diffusing the light generated by light-emitting diodes (LEDs) in edge-lit digital displays, including computer monitors, televisions and signage.

== Purpose ==
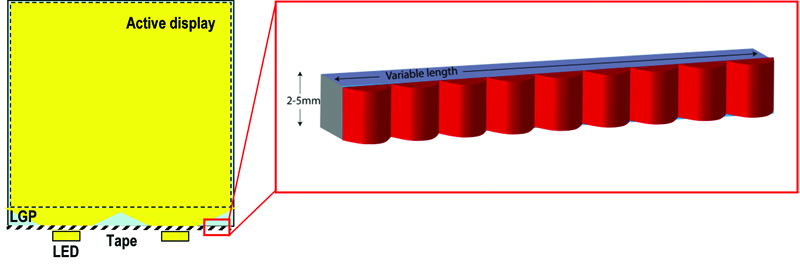
Schematic of tape on light guide and microstructure

Compared to other sources of illumination, such as fluorescent and incandescent bulbs, LEDs are energy efficient and increasingly inexpensive. As hard-point light sources, however, LEDs have several significant limitations in edge-lit digital displays. First, the light generated by LEDs must be spread evenly to all parts of the display by a light guide (typically a plate of poly(methyl methacrylate)), which transports light by total internal reflection. Extraction patterns on the surface of the light-guide help to distribute the light evenly. However, even with a light guide, dark zones can be noticeable along the injection edge closest to the LEDs. The more widely spaced the LEDs are, the more pronounced the dark zones, but closely packed LEDs are less energy-efficient and can create thermal management issues. Dark zones can be camouflaged by a border or bezel, but this limits design options and the space available for displaying information.

Uniformity tape is designed to be applied directly to the injection edge of a light guide for the purpose of diffusing the light generated by LEDs. The microstructure consists of 12-50 μm linear aspheric prisms aligned perpendicular to the plane of the guide. Since the microstructure is small compared to the spacing of the LEDs, no registration of the tape with the LEDs is required.

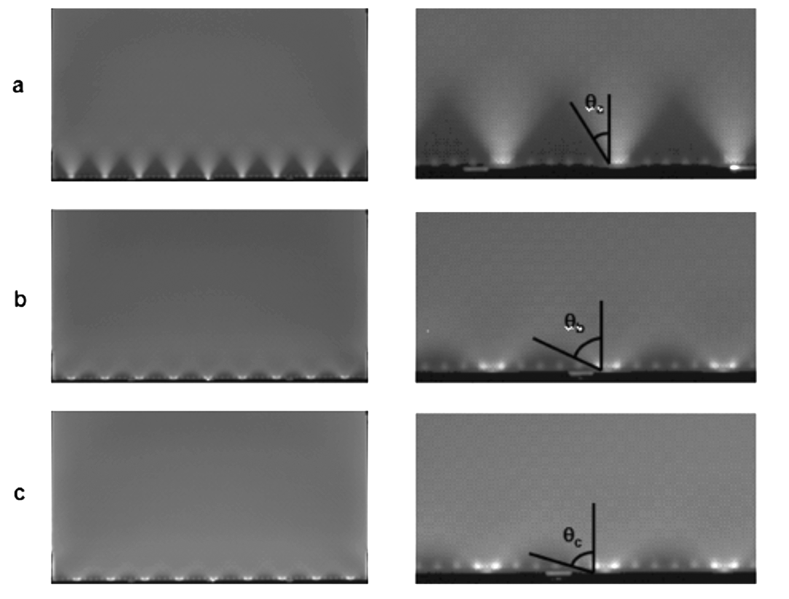
The left image in Figure 2a shows the injection cone angle (+/-42 degrees) of the LED into a light guide with an optically flat entrance face. The right image shows a close-up view of the left image. Figures 2b and 2c (and their details on the right) show the effects of two variations of 3M uniformity tape, with refractive indexed of 1.54 and 1.62, respectively.

Research conducted by 3M indicates that the tape enables a 50 percent reduction in LED count with little effect on overall system efficiency. Injection losses can be as low as 1-2 percent with a properly designed light guide. Additionally, when applied to the input edge of the light guide, the optically clear adhesive will wet out and conform to the surface roughness of the light guide edge, meaning that the PMMA plate does not require the level of polishing required in a conventional light guide.

== See also ==
- Backlight
- Poly(methyl methacrylate)
- Total internal reflection
