= Whitacre College of Engineering =

Engineering college at Texas Tech University

Edward E. Whitacre Jr. College of Engineering
- Established: 1925
- Endowment: $100 million
- Dean: Roland Faller
- Faculty: 155
- Students: 5,088
- Undergraduates: 4,360
- Postgraduates: 728
- Location: Lubbock, Texas, U.S. 33.587172°N 101.876017°W
- Website: www.coe.ttu.edu

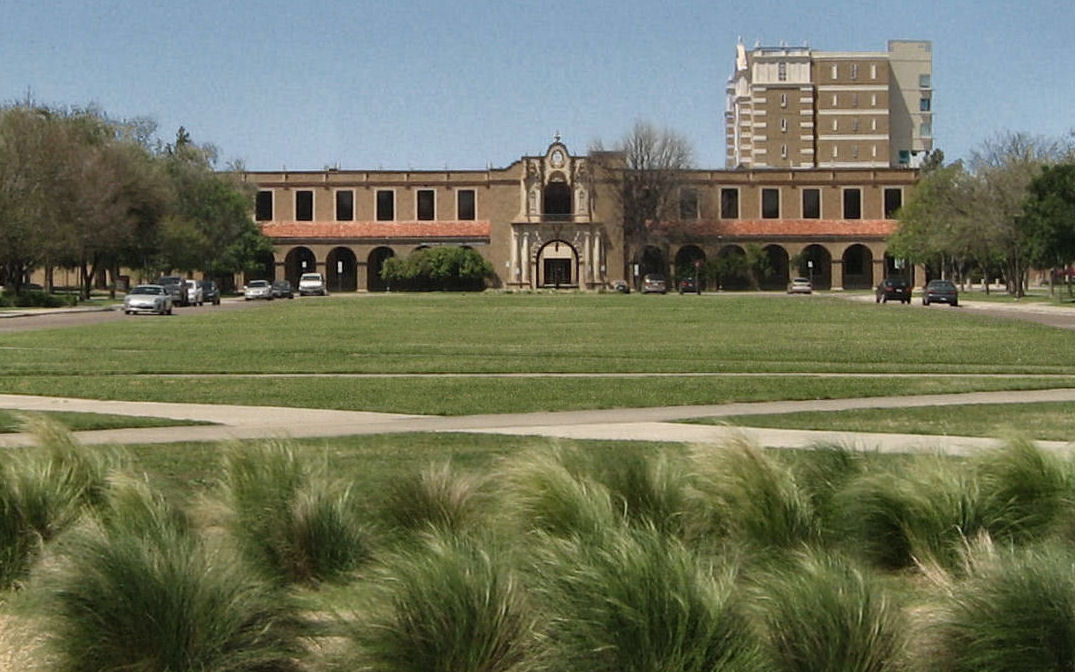
Engineering Key

The Edward E. Whitacre Jr. College of Engineering is the college of engineering at Texas Tech University in Lubbock, Texas. The engineering program has existed at Texas Tech University since 1925. Additionally, the Whitacre College of Engineering administers graduate engineering degree programs at the university's campus in Amarillo, Texas. Many of the college's degree programs are accredited by ABET. The Whitacre College of Engineering is the first and, presently, only school in the world to offer a doctor of philosophy degree in wind science and engineering.

In August 2008, the Whitacre College of Engineering announced that it would rename its petroleum engineering department the Bob L. Herd Department of Petroleum Engineering. Herd, a Texas Tech petroleum engineering alumnus and Tyler, Texas oil man, donated $15 million to the college. The department was ranked tenth in the nation in the April 2008 edition of U.S. News & World Report.

== History ==
The Texas Technological College, present day Texas Tech University, School of Engineering was created in the fall of 1925. At that time the school consisted of 313 students and two faculty members, and was housed in the textile engineering building, now the mechanical engineering building. In 1928, the School of Engineering expanded and opened the west engineering building, now the electrical and computer engineering building. The school's civil, electrical, industrial, mechanical, and textile engineering programs were accredited by the Engineering Council for Professional Development in 1933. The chemical engineering and petroleum engineering programs were accredited in 1959 and 1960 respectively. The chemical engineering building opened for classes in 1960. In the early 1970s the Pulsed Power Research Center was created for the purpose of plasma research.

On November 12, 2008, Texas Tech announced that they received a $25 million gift in honor of alumnus Edward E. Whitacre Jr. The college was then renamed the Edward E. Whitacre Jr. College of Engineering.

== Recognitions ==
In 2011, Texas Tech’s Whitacre College of Engineering was ranked 78th in the nation by U.S. News & World Report. In the magazine's 2010 graduate engineering rankings, the overall graduate engineering program moved up to 99th among 198 programs nationwide. The Department of Industrial Engineering ranked 29th in the industrial/manufacturing category.

Texas Tech University recently made the top ten in Forbes.com survey of the "Best Colleges for Women and Minorities in STEM." Texas Tech ranked the No. 7 "Best Colleges for Minorities in STEM."

Hispanic Business magazine's September 2007 issue ranked the Whitacre College of Engineering as the 14th best in the United States for Hispanic students. The college focused on enrolling students from minority backgrounds and from 2006 to 2007, freshman Hispanic enrollment increased by 23 percent.

== Academic departments ==
- Chemical Engineering
- Civil and Environmental Engineering
- Computer Science
- Electrical and Computer Engineering
- Construction Engineering and Engineering Technology
- Industrial, Manufacturing, and Systems Engineering
- Mechanical Engineering
- Petroleum Engineering

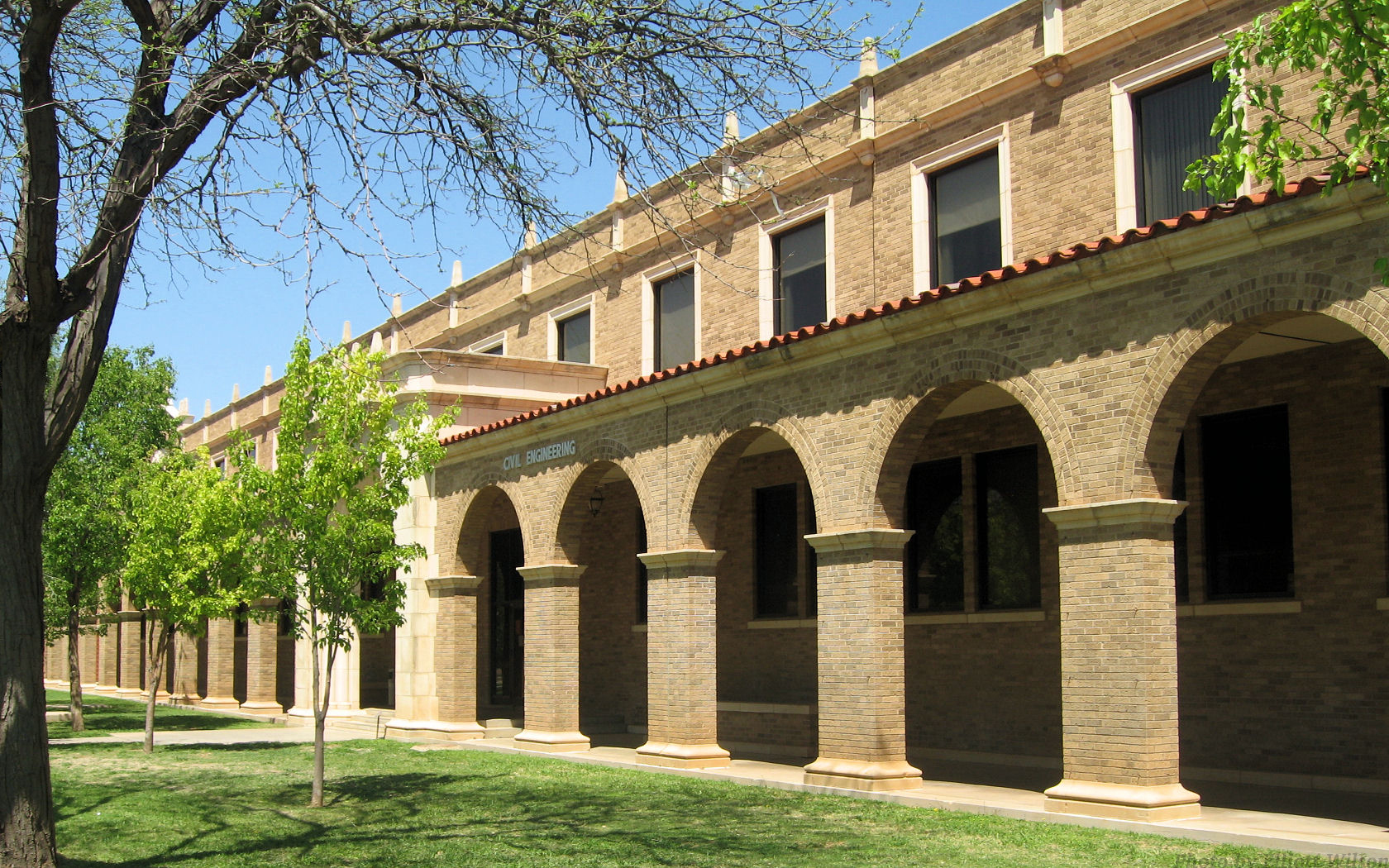
Civil engineering building

== Research centers ==
=== Center for Advanced Intelligent Systems ===
The Center for Advanced Intelligent Systems is an interdisciplinary laboratory in the computer science department. Currently the center conducts research in the fields of data understanding, human-centered computing, computational mechanics and materials, declarative languages and software engineering. The center's research on data understanding is focused on data and knowledge representation, finding causal links, and mining of large databases containing macro and micro data. The center also researches seamless interaction of dry and wet intelligent agents in the field of human-centered computing. Its declarative languages research aims to develop intuitive abstractions for the construction of symbolic and numerical computations. In the field of software engineering, the center is also conducting research on the impact of software architecture, classifications of software, and technology transfer considerations on the process of software development.

=== Center for Engineering Outreach ===
The principal goal of the Center of Engineering Outreach is to promote integration of engineering education in K-14 education at the regional and state level. The center aims to accomplish this by developing curricula, teacher training, and other academic resources designed to help K-14 educators and institutions engage students in the fields of engineering. To work towards this goal, the center provides experiences that reinforce interest and learning about engineering at the K-14 level through competitions, mentoring, campus visits and early admission.

=== Center for Multidisciplinary Research in Transportation ===
The Center for Multidisciplinary Research in Transportation (TechMRT) was established in 1997 to serve as a focal point between Texas Tech and the various transportation research funding organizations and programs. In the area of pavement engineering and construction, the center has conducted research on constructability and material selection for surface treatments, asphalt binder quality assurance and best practices for pavement edge maintenance and repair. TechMRT's research in environmental and right-of-way issues has included projects on developing an integrated roadside management system for TxDOT and addressing fire ant dispersal along Texas highways. In the field of geotechnical engineering, the center also conducts research in the area of expansive solids, pavements and foundations, as well as in the areas of design, construction, and performance of geotechnical systems including earth retention systems, bridge foundations and bridge approaches. TechMRT also conducts research in the area of transportation structures including projects in innovative design and construction methods for off-system bridges, controlling vibration in cable-stayed bridges, rapid bridge replacement and live load testing of a sandwich plate system. The traffic engineering branch of TechMRT was created in 2004 and has conducted research in ways to make highways and intersections safer from aggressive drivers, as well as methods to make roadways safer during weather events.

=== Center For Pulsed Power and Power Electronics (P^{3}E) ===
The Center For Pulsed Power and Power Electronics (P^{3}E) conducts interdisciplinary research in plasma, pulsed power, and power electronics. Plasma research at Texas Tech started in 1966, and was focused on harmonic ion cyclotron resonances in small mirror machines, laser heating of magnetized plasmas, and pellet injection in hot dense plasmas. In 1977 a small Tokamak was constructed for the purpose of wave propagation studies in the ion cyclotron range of frequencies. In recent years, the emphasis of P^{3}E has shifted to theoretical wave propagation and turbulence studies, as well as applications of plasma technology to pulsed power devices, plasma synthesis of thin films, high power microwave generation, and electric space propulsion engines.

Pulsed power research at Texas Tech began in the early 1970s with studies in high beta controlled thermonuclear fusion. Based on this initial research and other research in the field the need to understand the physical phenomena of pulsed power technology. Today the Texas Tech pulsed power research program at P^{3}E focuses on high power switching, materials studies, and high power microwaves.

P^{3}E's power electronics research is focused on the usage of very large power insulated-gate bipolar transistors (IGBT) for intermittent and steady state operation, the use of ultra high power silicon-controlled rectifiers (SCR) for pulsed power applications, research into advanced electrical and thermal packaging, robust controls to supply nonlinear loads such as plasma arcs, and high bandwidth monitoring and control of electric machines. The program is also working collaboratively with the University of Minnesota to develop a power electronics curriculum at the national level.

=== Nano Tech Center ===
In the fall of 1999, the Texas Tech Nano Tech Center was formed to capitalize on the growing interest in microsensors and microanalysis systems. Currently the center is focused on the fundamental science and growth of advanced semiconductor materials for optoelectronic and CMOS applications, and the design, fabrication, characterization and implementation of microelectromechanical systems (MEMS).

=== National Wind Institute ===
The National Wind Institute Research Center at Texas Tech is an interdisciplinary research center focused on education and information outreach. Its goals are to exploit the useful qualities of wind and to mitigate its detrimental effects. The Center offers an education in wind science and engineering to develop professionals who are experts in design for windstorms and wind-induced effects. Currently the NWI is composed of approximately 25 faculty associates from seven academic departments, four research associates, eight professional staff and 40 graduate students. It is also the home to the only wind science and engineering doctorate program.

== Notable people ==
=== Faculty ===
Name	Department	Notability	Joined TTU	Left/retired	Alumnus/na?	Refs
M. M. Ayoub	Ergonomics	Pioneer in the field of Ergonomics		(Active)	no	
Fazle Hussain	Fluid Dynamics	National Academy of Engineering member,	2013	(Active)	no	
Kishor C. Mehta	Wind Engineering	National Academy of Engineering member, director of Wind Science and Engineering Research Center, developed the Enhanced Fujita Scale.	1965	(Active)	no	
