= Qualia (Sony) =

Series of electronic products by Sony

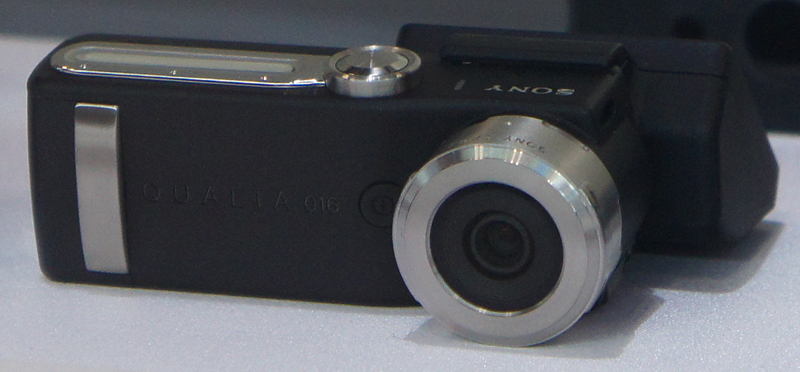
Sony Qualia 016 digital camera from 2003

Qualia was a boutique brand of high-end electronics, created by Sony to showcase their best technology. Some Qualia products were newly designed while others were upgraded and rebranded versions of regular Sony products. The line was launched in Japan in June 2003 and the U.S. in April 2004. In 2005, Sony discontinued the Qualia series except in the United States. In early 2006, Sony discontinued the series in the US as well.

== Products ==
	Function	Unveiled	RRP	Model number	Based on
Qualia 001	Video processor	January 2005	US$5,080	Q001-CB01	-
Qualia 002	HDV camcorder	April 2005	US$5,800	Q002-HDR1	HDR-FX1
Qualia 004	SXRD Video projector	June 2003	US$25,000	Q004-R1	-
Qualia 005	46" LCD television	August 2004	US$10,000	KDX46Q005	-
Qualia 006	70" SXRD rear-projection television	September 2004	US$15,000	KDS-70Q006	KDS-70XBR100
Qualia 007	SACD player and amplifier	June 2003	US$6,700	Q007-SCD	-
Qualia 010	Headphones	April 2004	US$2,400	Q010-MDR1	
Qualia 015	36" CRT television	June 2003	US$11,000	Q015-KX36	
Qualia 016	Modular compact digital camera	June 2003	US$4,000	Q016-WE1 ]	-
Qualia 017	MiniDisc player	June 2004	US$1,700	Q017-MD1	MZ-E10
-	In-ear headphones	June 2004	US$200	MDR-EXQ1	MDR-EX71
