= Solar camera =

Early form of photographic enlarger employing sunlight

The solar camera, or solar enlarger, is an ancestor of the darkroom enlarger, and was used in the mid-to-late 19th century to make photographic enlargements from negatives.

== Other uses ==
The name Solar was registered as the brand of an unrelated electrically illuminated darkroom enlarger marketed post-WW2 in the United States by Burke & James Inc., Chicago.

== Description ==
Early photographic materials were less light sensitive, and prints were made by simple superposition ("Contact prints"). The solar camera enlarger permitted photographers to make enlargements from glass negatives. However, exposures required for making such copies from negatives increase inversely with enlargement area. Photographers therefore employed the most powerful light source then available: the Sun.

Solar cameras were at first freestanding, a design based on picture-taking cameras but with the relative position of negative and lens reversed so that sunlight shone through the glass plate to be projected onto photo-sensitive paper or an emulsion on other substrates (glass, fabric, leather etc.) inside the instrument. Mounted on a stand, they could be swivelled to continuously face the Sun, and were later built into the structure of a darkroom with an opening to the sky to admit light.

The intensity of the light, and heat, they transmitted and concentrated through condensers can be gauged from reports of near loss of life when a fire started from a late version of the device, built in to a darkroom, was left unattended and still open to full sunlight. Jacob Wothly's huge version of the device required water troughs to keep it cool enough to use safely.

== Inventors ==
A number of photographers, inventors and photographic businesses contributed to the design development of the solar camera.

An antecedent was the solar microscope of c.1740, employed in experiments with photosensitive silver nitrate by Thomas Wedgwood and Humphry Davy in making the first, but impermanent, photographic enlargements. Their discoveries were published in June 1802 by Davy in his An Account of a Method of Copying Paintings upon Glass, and of Making Profiles, by the Agency of Light upon Nitrate of Silver. Invented by T. Wedgwood, Esq. With Observations by H. Davy in the first issue of the Journals of the Royal Institution of Great Britain.

John Towler, writing in 1864 is at pains to point out that; "The appendages to the solar camera and to the solar microscope are facsimiles of each other; but the solar microscope existed before photography had been elicited from chaos; the solar camera, therefore, is a mere imitation of its antecedent; the patentees of the latter instrument, then, can make no claim to originality of design; their only claim can be the application of the instrument to photography."

Baltimore photographer and professor of drawing at the Government School of Design, David Acheson Woodward's 1857 solar enlarging camera was an evolution of the solar microscope, and was a large instrument operated out-of-doors that could produce life size prints from quarter plate and half plate negatives with an exposure of about forty-five minutes. During his visit to England to exhibit and market his device, the Liverpool Mercury reported that his pictures "were universally admired. One of the prints had been enlarged from 6 1/2 inches (17 cm) to about 3 feet [91 cm], and yet the greatest clearness and accuracy were preserved." His apparatus was made in two sizes: one with a 9 in (23 cm) condenser for half-plates that cost £21 (£2,845.61 or $US3,760.29 in 2020); the smaller had a 5 in (13 cm) condenser for quarter-plates costing £13. In 1860 the photo-microscopist Auguste-Adolphe Bertsch improved the Woodward design with a second condenser.

Prominent London photographer the French-born Antoine Claudet was a user and active promoter of the solar camera, who lectured on the subject to the British Association in Oxford in June 1860, and in 1862 presented "On the means of following the small divisions of the scale regulating the distances and enlargement in the solar camera" at the British Association for the Advancement of Science in October. Earlier that year he exhibited a number of life-size portrait enlargements from carte de visite negatives at the 1862 World Fair, which were praised as 'magnificent' and 'without distortion', the reviewer noting that Claudet would have exhibited more but "for the continued absence of sunlight during the last few weeks."

In the 1860s and 1870s advances on Woodward's design were made. Jacob Wothly of Aachen improved Woodward's design with a reflector and condenser of one metre (39 inches) diameter and a focus of two meters (about 6½feet), attracting much attention, and presented it to the French Academy of Sciences, October 8, 1860, and at the Societe Francaise de Photographie in early November 1860, selling the design to Disderi, reportedly for 20,000 francs soon after, who was awarded a medal for his enlarged photographs at the 1862 London International Exhibition. Further adjustments to the original design included a clockwork heliostat, such as that invented by Léon Foucault in 1862 and built by his son-in-law, to rotate the mirror in synchronisation with the Sun's passage to concentrate its light on the condenser lens.

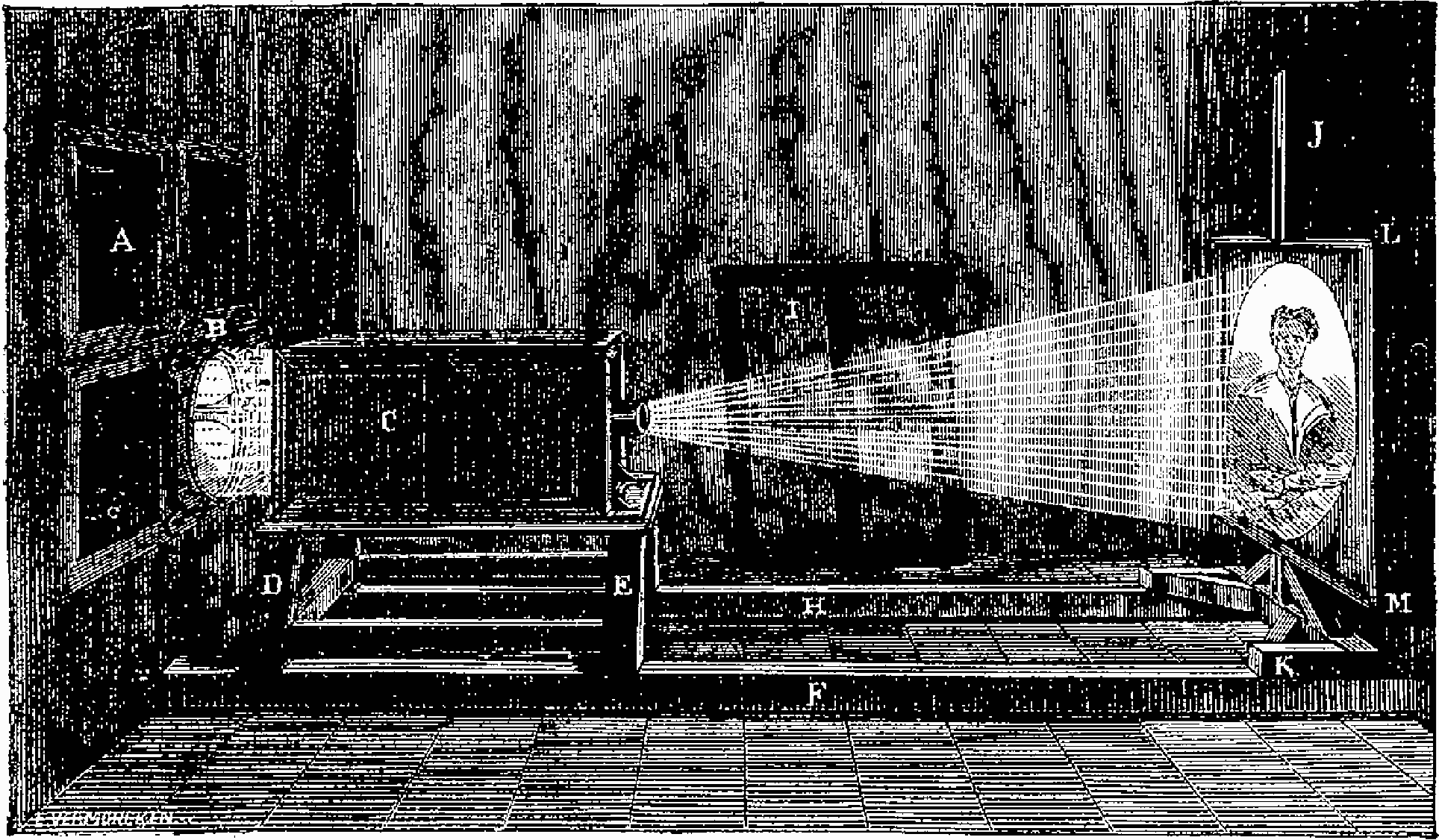
M. Monckhoven's 1864 solar enlarger (engraving)

Belgian photochemist and professional photographer Désiré van Monckhoven registered in August 1863 a patent for "an optical apparatus intended for enlarging by projection". It diverged from Woodward's design and had an appearance more like a modern horizontal enlarger and used a heliostat mirror instead of being pointed at the sun directly. It corrected for spherical aberration ("appareil solar dialytique") for sharper, more even light, for which he received a bronze medal at the Exposition Universelle (1867). After securing patents in England and France he went into manufacture. His apparatus was built into the darkroom wall, while J.F. Campbell's vertical design of the following year gathered light through an opening in the roof.

Nadar used Alphonse Liebert's enlarger for his first enlargements around that time, a design which used a hand-operated drive to keep the condenser lens focussed on the sun directly; with no mirrors, exposure times were decreased.

Louis Jules Duboscq's apparatus, like Quinet's, used electric light, and was shown to the Paris Photographic Society in 1861.

== Value in photography ==
The calling-card format carte de visite was gaining popularity in the late 1850s, but there was increasing demand for larger portraits, which were normally contact printed from larger negatives, requiring an unwieldy lens and camera, an inconvenience which, professionals concluded, was "not repaid by a proportionate increase in the size and sharpness of the picture obtained; and that it is more practicable to obtain extra-sized pictures by enlarging with a solar camera." Julia Margaret Cameron for example chose to emphasise the 'from Life' quality she desired by using a camera that took 38 cm × 30.5 cm (15.0 in × 12.0 in) plates and, despite the availability of solar camera, she contact-printed all her negatives; but even with the relatively wide aperture of f8, for whole head close-ups, exposures were up to five minutes. The carte de visite by contrast, particularly with Disderi's camera that could shoot several frames on the one sheet, needed exposures only of between 2 and 10 seconds, and thus made more spontaneous portraits than could be achieved with the longer exposures needed for a large-format camera. They could be enlarged with the solar camera up to life-size, retaining detail. Claudet, at the British Association for the Advancement of Science in October 1862, was reported as having;

"exhibited last night a number of cartes de visite enlarged by the solar camera, showing the great perfection of proportion and the natural expression which may be impart to portraits when they are taken in a very short sitting, and with the apparatus placed at a proper distance from the persons, as is the case for small pictures."

The British Journal of Photography summed up the value of enlargements to advancing the business of;

"Photographic portraiture—which, for a considerable period, suffered from what we may call a surfeit of carte de visite—has, during recent times, received a great impetus from the degree of perfection which has been attained in the production of enlargements by several of the now well-known processes. We are, of course, aware that much of the beauty and, consequently, the growing popularity of such pictures depend on the skill and judgment with which the apparently absolutely necessary “retouching" and "touching-up" is done; but there can be no doubt that, judging from the specimens so frequently met with in photographic saloons, on the walls of our exhibitions, and in private collections, works of a high class, in this direction, is the rule rather than the exception.

== Use by artists ==
Woodward used sunlight and copying lenses for enlargements from a small negative onto large photographically sensitized paper or canvas, which he would then paint over in oils. In submitting his 1866 application for a renewal of his original patent, Woodward described the artistic applications of the instrument:

The object of my invention is, first, to furnish the artist or draftsman with an instrument by which he may be enabled to produce an accurate image of the object to be delineated by photography, and that will afterward portray on his canvas or other material an infallible representation thereof in light and shade, whereby a most accurate likeness or copy of any desired size may be produced, requiring only one sitting of the subject; and, secondly, to enable the photographic artist to print a picture on prepared paper, canvas, or other material of greater or less dimensions than those of the negative ordinarily used for such purpose, whereby he is enabled to use a more perfect negative produced by bringing the entire field of his picture within the focus of his instrument, and afterward throwing it up and printing it by concentrating the rays of light through the negative in the instrument and focusing the object on the prepared paper or canvas, instead of printing by superposition in the usual way.

Woodward's technique influenced others, including the American portrait painter Erastus Salisbury Field who completely overpainted the enlargements of portraits that he used. During Woodward's 1859 visit to England, Léon Cogniet also took up the technique.

Solar camera enlargements were newsworthy, reported in 1862 as "a most important and interesting application of science to the photographic art," and contemporaneous discussions of them make it apparent that they were compared in aesthetic terms to painting and drawing. In 1861 the British Journal of Photography presented a critique of the Birmingham Photographic Society awards, choosing the work of Owen Angel of Exeter for particular praise; "Unlike all the others, which are plain developed prints, those of Mr Angel are on aluminised paper, and toned with gold. With one exception they exhibit more artistic feeling than any other solar picture exhibited. An enlarged full-length group of two young ladies in walking dress is the most satisfactory; the pose is easy and graceful, the drapery clear and distinctly rendered and full of halftone, and the whole give evidence of careful study. With a few skilful touches from the hands of an artist such a picture would, as a portrait, be almost faultless...We are disposed to consider the pictures of Mr Angel as generally preferable to those of Messrs. Smyth and Blanchard, as they bear the impress of more studied and artistic feeling." A Mr. Turner, in receiving a silver medal, alongside Claudet, for 'a coloured enlarged photograph by the solar camera' at the same Birmingham Photographic Society awards doubted that "the mode of enlargement by the solar camera would ever be generally applicable to pure pictures" [i.e. 'straight photography'], and that in his opinion its great success would be in 'coloured' photographs.

In the United States in particular the life-size 'crayon portrait' – a hand-coloured solar camera or later, a magic lantern, enlargement – remained popular into the early 20th century, created using techniques described by Jerome A. Barhydt and other contemporary practitioners. Several appear on the wall behind Nina Leen's 1947 Ozark family group, an image included, itself much enlarged, as a centrepiece of 1955 The Family of Man exhibition, and chosen by Carl Sagan for the 12-inch Voyager Golden Records.

However the reception of solar enlargements, particularly those of large size, was not all positive; another reviewer of the 1862 International Exhibition remarked that "Mr Claudet and others exhibit some photographs enlarged by means of the solar camera, but we cannot say much in favour of them."

== Identifying characteristics ==
Often made life-size from a carte-de-visite negative 54.0 mm × 89 mm (2.13 in × 3.50 in) or, in an extreme case, enlarged 15x from 2.54 cm (1-inch) -square glass plates of the 'Pistolgraph' camera invented in 1859 by British photographer Thomas Skaife (1806–1876), the enlargement ratios were often considerable. Therefore, the resulting low-contrast prints usually required enhancement, the results often advertised as 'crayon portraits'; reworked with pastel crayons and varnished for protection. At first glance they resemble a photograph but close inspection detects distinctive crayon strokes, mostly distinct in the hair and beard areas, and outlining the irises of the eyes, and coat lapels and other margins. They were common in the latter part of the nineteenth century and were often made to life-size. Others were prints on sensitised canvas that was overpainted in oils, so that they are harder to distinguish from paintings. Portrait painters who could not afford to own an expensive solar camera could mail negatives to photographers such as Albert Moore of Philadelphia to enlarge the negative onto paper or canvas. They would use the photograph as a starting point and could freely alter backgrounds, fabric, style and patterns of the clothing, and even the sitter's expression.

== Demise ==
Use of the solar camera was dependent on the vagaries of weather conditions before the later introduction of limelight as an illuminant in enlargers, but it continued to be an expensive item of professional equipment. Advertisements in the British newspapers in the 1880s for second-hand solar cameras proliferated as professional photographers started to abandon the device, and by 1890, artificial light sources – gas, petroleum, limelight, magnesium and electric light bulb – sufficiently powerful to expose materials which were being made increasingly sensitive, were commonly used in enlargers, so when, that year, Josef Maria Eder installed a Wothly solar camera on the roof of Vienna's Höhere Graphische Bundes-Lehr- und Versuchsanstalt the students would have considered it a vintage curiosity.

Even at the turn of the century simple folding daylight enlargers still found a use amongst amateurs to easily produce prints of a fixed size; one made by Griffin and Sons to enlarge quarter-plates to whole plate size, with achromatic lens built in, was 12s 6d (£60, or $US80 in 2020); while other amateurs constructed their own from instructions in popular magazines. Some cameras were made convertible to use in a similar manner.

== See also ==
- Contact printer for a non-enlarging method of producing photographic prints;
- Image projector for a directory of projector types;
- Overhead projector for another use of a similar design, for multi-viewer display, mostly in education;
- Epidiascope for a design that could project images of opaque originals;
- Photographic printing for an overview of analogue photographic printmaking methods;
- Photo-crayotype process of hand-colouring photographic prints, usually enlarged;
- Hockney-Falco thesis for discussion of earlier use of projected enlargement by artists.
