= Acetate (disambiguation) =

An acetate is a salt or ester of acetic acid.

Acetate may also refer to:

- Cellulose acetate, the acetate ester of cellulose
- Acetate disc, disc used in record production
- Projector transparencies, sometimes referred to as acetates, or acetate sheets.
