= Projection panel =

A Projection panel (also called overhead display or LCD panel) is a device that, although no longer in production, was used as a data projector is today.

It works with an overhead projector. The panel consists of a translucent LCD, and a fan to keep it cool. The projection panel sits on the bed of the overhead projector, and acts like a piece of transparency. The panels have a VGA input, and sometimes Composite (RCA) and S-Video input. Later models have remotes, with functions such as 'freeze' which lets you freeze the image, useful for when you want to leave something on the screen whilst you do other things. Earlier models only had 640x480 resolution, while newer ones had up to SVGA resolution. Proxima, one maker of the panels, included a magic wand and sensor, which worked with the sensor detecting where you put the wand, to create and interactive effect, the equivalent of today's smart boards.

Although they are not produced anymore, used panels can be purchased for a fraction of the price of a data projector. The panels are quite dim, as they do not let a great deal of light through, so brightness can be a problem, even with a powerful overhead projector.
