= Episcope =

Episcope may refer to:

- Opaque projector
- Episcopal polity, within various Christian Churches and in ecumenical dialogue
- Episcope, an indirect-vision device similar to a periscope, used in armoured fighting vehicles
