= Overhead projector =

Device that projects a transparent image

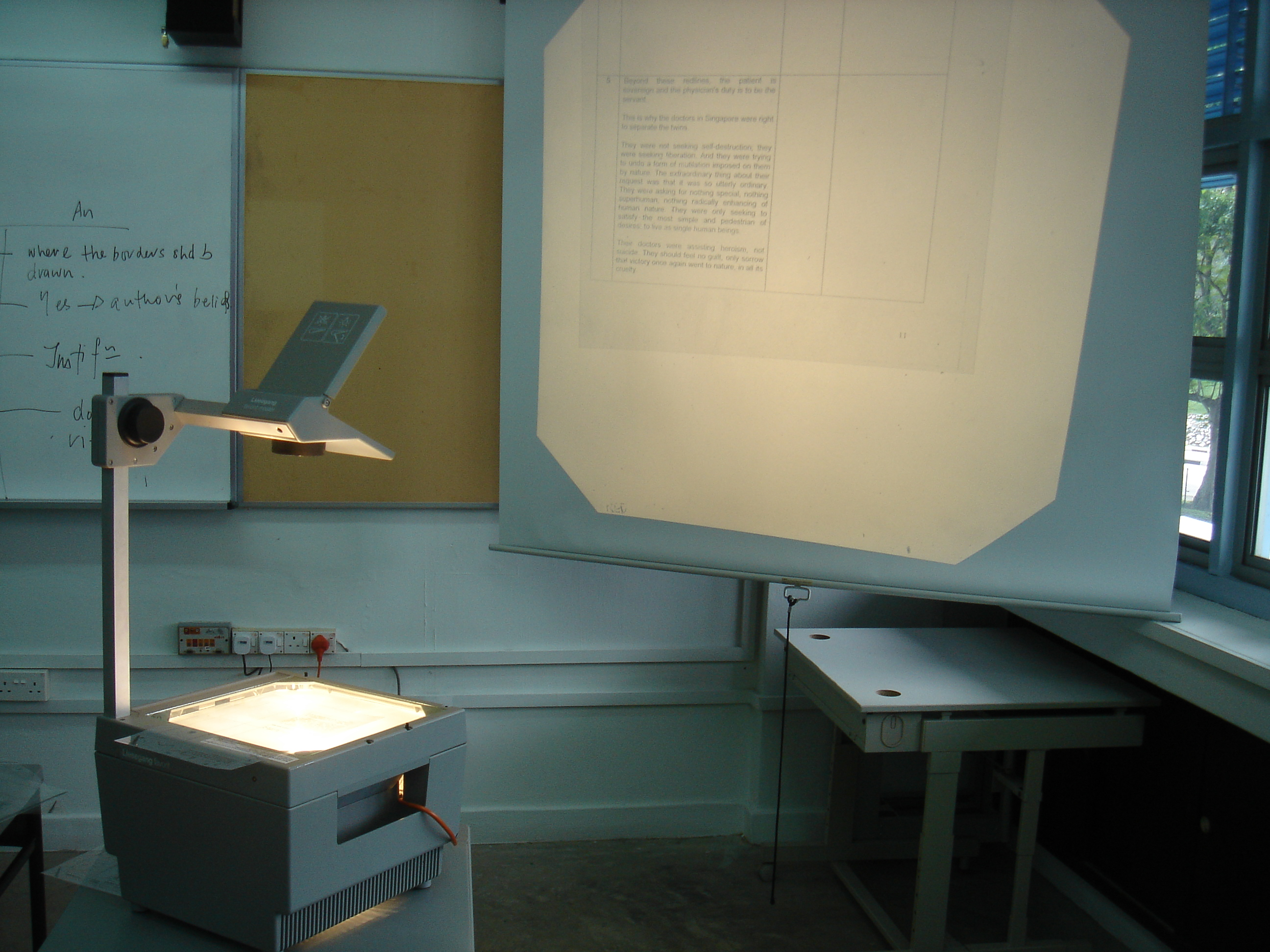
Overhead projector in operation during a classroom lesson

An overhead projector (often abbreviated to OHP), like a film or slide projector, uses light to project an enlarged image on a screen, allowing the view of a small document or picture to be shared with a large audience.

In the overhead projector, the source of the image is a page-sized sheet of transparent plastic film (also known as "viewfoils", "foils", "acetate" or "transparencies") with the image to be projected either printed or hand-written/drawn. These transparent sheets are placed on the glass platen of the projector, which has a light source below it and a projecting mirror and lens assembly above it (hence, "overhead"). They were widely used in education and business before the advent of video projectors.

== Optical system ==
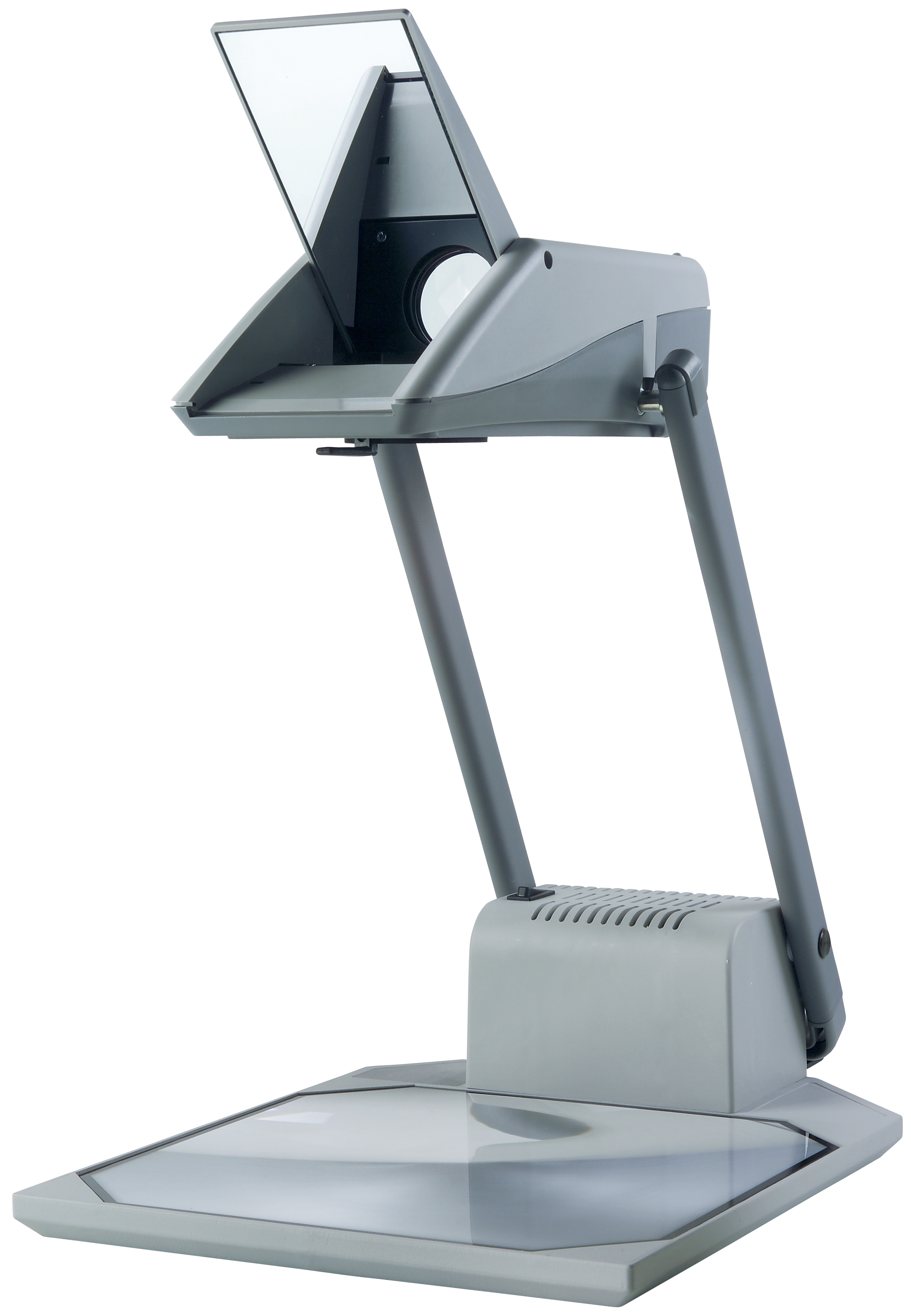
Mirror and lens

An overhead projector works on the same principle as a slide projector, in which a focusing lens projects light from an illuminated slide onto a projection screen where a real image is formed. However some differences are necessitated by the much larger size of the transparencies used (generally the size of a printed page), and the requirement that the transparency be placed face up (and readable to the presenter). For the latter purpose, the projector includes a mirror just before or after the focusing lens to fold the optical system toward the horizontal. That mirror also accomplishes a reversal of the image in order that the image projected onto the screen corresponds to that of the slide as seen by the presenter looking down at it, rather than a mirror image thereof. Therefore, the transparency is placed face up (toward the mirror and focusing lens), in contrast with a 35mm slide projector or film projector (which lack such a mirror) where the slide's image is non-reversed on the side opposite the focusing lens.

A related invention for enlarging transparent images is the solar camera. The opaque projector, or episcope is a device which displays opaque materials by shining a bright lamp onto the object from above. The episcope must be distinguished from the diascope, which is a projector used for projecting images of transparent objects (such as films or slides), and from the epidiascope, which is capable of projecting images of both opaque and transparent objects.

=== Condenser ===
Because the focusing lens (typically less than 10 cm [3.9 in] in diameter) is much smaller than the transparency, a crucial role is played by the optical condenser which illuminates the transparency. Since this requires a large optical lens (at least the size of the transparency) but may be of poor optical quality (since the sharpness of the image does not depend on it), a Fresnel lens is employed. The Fresnel lens is located at (or is part of) the glass plate on which the transparency is placed, and serves to redirect most of the light hitting it into a converging cone toward the focusing lens. Without such a condenser at that point, most of the light would miss the focusing lens (or else the focusing lens would have to be very large and prohibitively expensive). Additionally, mirrors or other condensing elements below the Fresnel lens serve to increase the portion of the light bulb's output which reaches the Fresnel lens in the first place. In order to provide sufficient light on the screen, a high intensity bulb is used which often requires fan cooling.

=== Focus adjustment ===
Overhead projectors normally include a manual focusing mechanism which raises and lowers the position of the focusing lens (including the folding mirror) in order to adjust the object distance (optical distance between the slide and the lens) to focus at the chosen image distance (distance to the projection screen) given the fixed focal length of the focusing lens. This permits a range of projection distances.

Increasing (or decreasing) the projection distance increases (or decreases) the focusing system's magnification in order to fit the projection screen in use (or sometimes just to accommodate the room setup). Increasing the projection distance also means that the same amount of light is spread over a larger screen, resulting in a dimmer image. With a change in the projection distance, the focusing must be readjusted for a sharp image. However, the condensing optics (Fresnel lens) is optimized for one particular vertical position of the lens, corresponding to one projection distance. Therefore, when it is focused for a greatly different projection distance, part of the light cone projected by the Fresnel lens towards the focusing lens misses that lens. This has the greatest effect towards the outer edges of the projected image, so that one typically sees either blue or brown fringing at the edge of the screen when the focus is towards an extreme. Using the projector near its recommended projection distance allows a focusing position where this is avoided and the intensity across the screen is approximately uniform.

=== Source of illumination ===
The lamp technology of an overhead projector is typically very simple compared to a modern LCD or DLP video projector. Most overheads use an extremely high-power halogen lamp that may consume up to 750 or 1000 watts. A high-flow blower is required to keep the bulb from melting due to the heat generated, and this blower is often on a timer that keeps it running for a period after the light is extinguished.

Further, the intense heat accelerates failure of the high intensity lamp, often burning out in less than 100 hours, requiring replacement, which is often the most expensive part of owning a projector. In contrast, a modern LCD or DLP projector often uses an Ultra-high-performance lamp which has a higher luminous efficacy and lasts for thousands of hours. A drawback of that technology is the warm up time required for such lamps.

Older overhead projectors used a tubular quartz bulb which was mounted above a bowl-shaped polished reflector. However, because the lamp was suspended above and outside the reflector, a large amount of light was cast to the sides inside the projector body that was wasted, thus requiring a higher power lamp for sufficient screen illumination. More modern overhead projectors use an integrated lamp and conical reflector assembly, allowing the lamp to be located deep within the reflector and sending a greater portion of its light towards the Fresnel lens; this permits using a lower power lamp for the same screen illumination.

A useful innovation for overhead projectors with integrated lamps/reflectors is the quick-swap dual-lamp control, allowing two lamps to be installed in the projector in movable sockets. If one lamp fails during a presentation the presenter can merely move a lever to slide the spare into position and continue with the presentation, without needing to open the projection unit or waiting for the failed bulb to cool before replacing it.

== History ==
Some early-modern projectors, such as the magic lantern and steganographic mirror, can be regarded as predecessors of the overhead projector.

German Jesuit scholar Athanasius Kircher's 1645 book Ars Magna Lucis et Umbrae included a description of his invention, the "Steganographic Mirror": a primitive projection system with a focusing lens and text or pictures painted on a concave mirror reflecting sunlight, mostly intended for long-distance communication. In 1654 Belgian Jesuit mathematician André Tacquet used Kircher's technique to show the journey from China to Belgium of Italian Jesuit missionary Martino Martini.

Dutch scientist Christiaan Huygens, who knew Athanasius Kircher's Ars Magna Lucius et Umbrae, is often credited as the inventor of the magic lantern, described in a correspondence dated to 1659.

The "solar microscope" was employed in early photographic experiments with photosensitive silver nitrate by Thomas Wedgwood and Humphry Davy in making the first, but impermanent, enlargements of minute objects.

French physicist Edmond Becquerel developed the first known overhead projection apparatus in 1853. It was demonstrated by French instrument maker and inventor Jules Duboscq in 1866.

Subsequently, in 1857 Baltimore painter David Acheson Woodward' patented a solar enlarging camera, a large instrument operated out-of-doors. It used sunlight and copying lenses for enlargements from a small negative onto large photographically sensitized paper or canvas. Portrait artists found it a boon that provided a guide in making accurate likenesses which they would paint in oils, watercolour or pastel over the enlargement, often made at life size.

An overhead projector designed by American scientist Henry Morton was marketed around 1880 as a "vertical lantern".

The use of transparent sheets for overhead projection, called viewfoils or viewgraphs, was largely developed in the United States. Overhead projectors were introduced into U.S. military training during World War II as early as 1940 and were quickly being taken up by tertiary educators, and within the decade they were being used in corporations. After the war they were used at schools like the U.S. Military Academy. The journal Higher Education of April 1952 noted;

The recent adaptation of plastic to the manufacture of condenser lenses has permitted a revolutionary redesign of a lecture-demonstration projector, now commonly referred to as an overhead projector. The flat lightweight plastic lens makes possible the use of a large horizontal stage aperture. This, coupled with a wide angle lens and an overhead reflector, directs the light vertically upward through the stage. Next, it is reflected horizontally to the screen. This optical arrangement provides the instructor with a number of advantages, among which are: the projector may be placed in front of the class; the brilliant light permits excellent screen visibility without darkening a room; the instructor may place transparent images on the horizontal stage or diagram extemporaneously on it without turning away from his class. Early interest in the use of 'vertical' projection for demonstrating science phenomena is evidenced by the publication of an article on this subject in 1940. Previous limitations in weight and aperture size have been overcome by the substitution of plastic for the heavier glass condenser. Thus, transparencies (slides) up to 10 x 10 inches in size may be used. As a lecture-demonstration instrument, the overhead projector is destined to gain popularity with university instructors because it facilitates the instructor's command of the psychological advantages of visual presentation without sacrifice of his identity as the instructor and class leader. A further advantage of this visual medium lies in its adaptability to the use of transparent pictorials locally prepared...

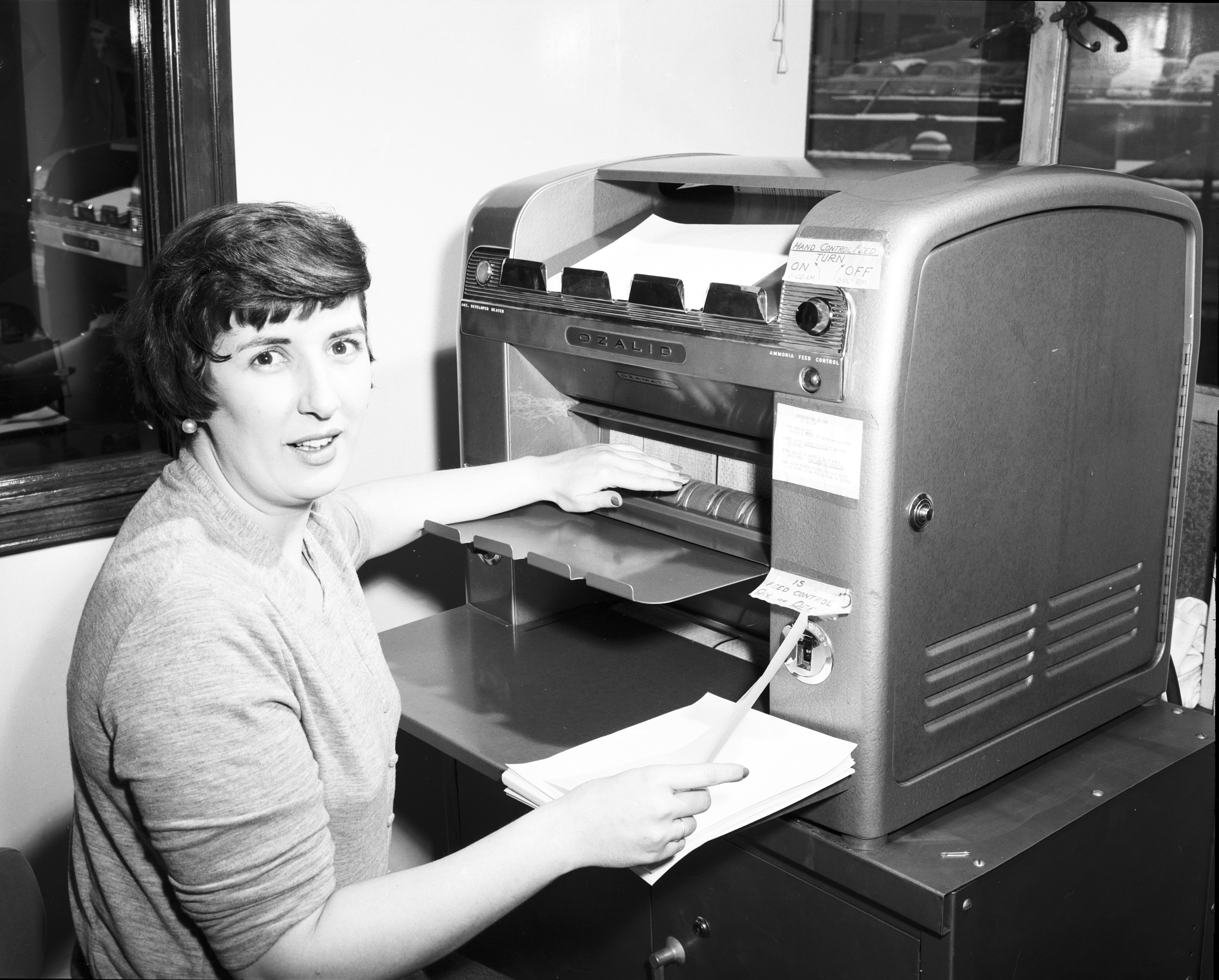
A worker loads documents into an Ozalid printer.

Allied to the US Navy development of the improved lightweight overhead projector was its adaptation of the Ozalid dry printing process, developed in Germany in 1923, to copy training documents and illustrations on projection transparencies, a process simple enough to be carried out in the field and which ensured uniformity of instructional material used.

Overhead projectors were used early on for police work with a cellophane roll over a 9-inch stage, allowing facial characteristics to be rolled across the stage.

As the demand for projectors grew, Buhl Industries was founded in 1953, and became the leading US contributor for several optical refinements for the overhead projector and its projection lens.

Overhead projectors began to be widely used in schools and businesses in the late 1950s and early 1960s, beside the contemporaneously developed carousel slide projectors with a horizontally mounted tray manufactured by Kodak.

In the late 1950s Roger Appeldorn was challenged by his boss at 3M to find a use for the transparencies that were the waste of their color copy process. Appeldorn developed a process for the projection of transparent sheets that led to 3M's first marketable transparency film. The Strategic Air Command base in Omaha was one of the first big clients, using circa 20,000 sheets per month. 3M then decided to develop their own overhead projector instead of the one they had been selling until then, which was produced by an outside manufacturer. It took several prototypes before a cost-effective, small and foldable version could be presented on January 15, 1962. It had a new Fresnel lens made with a structured-surface plastic, much better than other plastic lenses and much cheaper than glass. In 1957, the United States' first Federal Aid to Education program stimulated overhead sales which remained high up to the late 1990s and into the 21st Century.

=== Use in education ===
Overhead projectors were widely used in education and business before the advent of computer-based projection.

The overhead projector facilitates an easy low-cost interactive environment for educators. Teaching materials can be pre-printed on plastic sheets, upon which the educator can directly write using a non-permanent, washable color marking pen. This saves time, since the transparency can be pre-printed and used repetitively, rather than having materials written manually before each class.

The overhead is typically placed at a comfortable writing height for the educator and allows the educator to face the class, facilitating better communication between the students and teacher. The enlarging features of the projector allow the educator to write in a comfortable small script in a natural writing position rather than writing in an overly large script on a blackboard and having to constantly hold their arm out in midair to write on the blackboard.

When the transparency sheet is full of written or drawn material, it can simply be replaced with a new, fresh sheet with more pre-printed material, again saving class time vs a blackboard that would need to be erased and teaching materials rewritten by the educator. Following the class period, the transparencies are easily restored to their original unused state by washing off with soap and water.

=== LCD overhead displays ===
In the early 1980s–1990s, overhead projectors were used as part of a classroom computer display/projection system. A liquid-crystal panel mounted in a plastic frame was placed on top of the overhead projector and connected to the video output of the computer, often splitting off the normal monitor output. A cooling fan in the frame of the LCD panel would blow cooling air across the LCD to prevent overheating that would fog the image.

The first of these LCD panels were monochrome-only, and could display NTSC video output such as from an Apple II computer or VCR. In the late 1980s, color models became available, capable of "thousands" of colors (16-bit color), for the color Macintosh and VGA PCs. The displays were never particularly fast to refresh or update, resulting in the smearing of fast-moving images, but it was acceptable when nothing else was available.

The Do-It-Yourself community has started using this idea to make low-cost home theater projectors. By removing the casing and backlight assembly of a common LCD monitor, one can use the exposed LCD screen in conjunction with the overhead projector to project the contents of the LCD screen to the wall at a much lower cost than with standard LCD projectors. Due to the mirroring of the image in the head of the overhead projector, the image on the wall is "re-flipped" to where it would be if one was looking at the LCD screen normally.

=== Decline in use ===
Overhead projectors were once a common fixture in most classrooms and business conference rooms in the United States and Canada, but in the 2000s they were slowly replaced by document cameras, dedicated computer projection systems and interactive whiteboards. Such systems allow the presenter to project directly from an application such as Microsoft PowerPoint or LibreOffice, and presentations can include animations, interactive components, and video clips. The image quality from these systems is generally better than an overhead projector. The need to print or photocopy color transparencies is eliminated.

== See also ==
- Filmstrip
- Opaque projector
- Slide projector
- Slide show
- Telestrator
- Transparency (projection)

== Bibliography ==
- Green, Lee (1982). 501 Ways to Use the Overhead Projector. ABC-CLIO, Libraries Unlimited. ISBN 0-87287-339-0.
