= Transparency (projection) =

Plastic sheet for an overhead projector

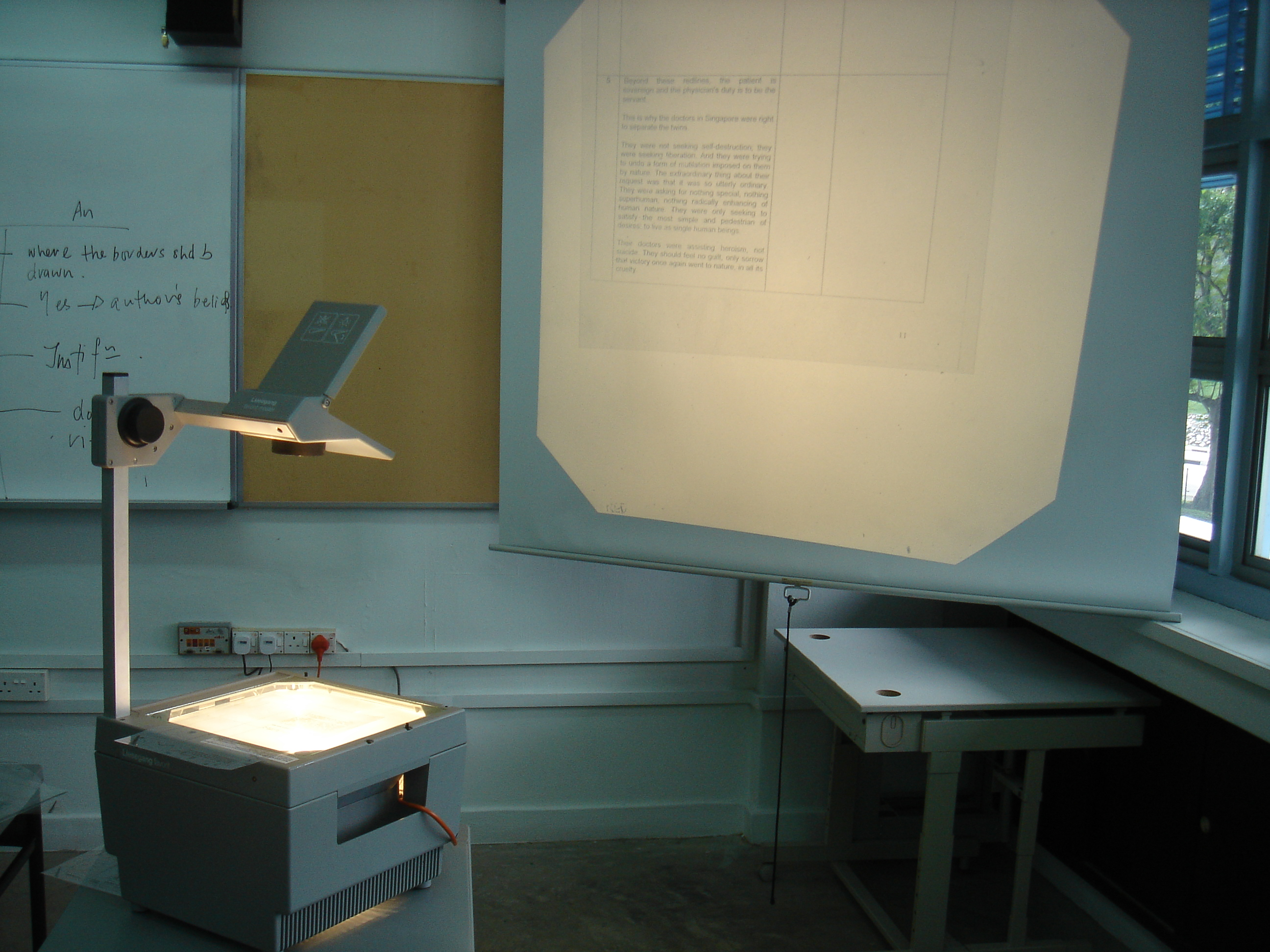
Overhead projector in operation, with a transparency being flashed

A transparency, also known variously as a viewfoil or foil (from the French word "feuille" or sheet), or viewgraph, is a thin sheet of transparent flexible material, typically polyester (historically cellulose acetate), onto which figures can be drawn. These are then placed on an overhead projector for display to an audience. Many companies and small organizations use a system of projectors and transparencies in meetings and other groupings of people, though this system has been largely replaced by video projectors and interactive whiteboards.

== Printing ==
Transparencies can be printed using a variety of technologies. In the 1960s and 70s the GAF OZALID "projecto-viewfoil" used a diazo process to make a clear sheet framed in cardboard and protected by a rice paper cover. In the 1980s, laser printers or copiers could make foil sheets using standard xerographic processes. Specialist transparencies are available for use with laser printers that are better able to handle the high temperatures present in the fuser unit. For inkjet printers, coated transparencies are available that can absorb and hold the liquid ink—although care must be taken to avoid excessive exposure to moisture, which can cause the transparency to become cloudy; they must also be loaded correctly into the printer as they are only usually coated on one side.

== Uses ==
Uses for transparencies are as varied as the organizations that use them.

Certain classes, such as those associated with mathematics or history and geography use transparencies to illustrate a point or problem. Until the advent of LaTeX, math classes in particular used rolls of acetate to illustrate sufficiently long problems and to display mathematical symbols missing from common computer keyboards.

Aerospace companies, like Boeing and Beechcraft, used transparencies for years in management meetings in order to brief engineers and relevant personnel about new aircraft designs and changes to existing designs, as well as bring up illustrated problems.

Some churches and other religious organizations used them to show song lyrics, sermon outlines, and illustrate certain topics such as Old Testament battles and Jewish artifacts during worship services, as well as outline business meetings.

== Spatial light modulators (SLMs) ==
Many overhead projectors are used with a flat-panel LCD which, when used this way, is referred to as a spatial light modulator or SLM. Data projectors are often based on some form of SLM in a projection path. An LCD is a transmissive SLM, whereas other technologies such as Texas Instrument's DLP are reflective SLMs. Not all projectors use SLMs (e.g., some use devices that produce their own light rather than function as transparencies). An example of non-SLM system are organic light-emitting diodes (OLEDs).

== See also ==
- Presentation slide
- Projection panel
- Reversal film
