= Hockney–Falco thesis =

Theory in art history

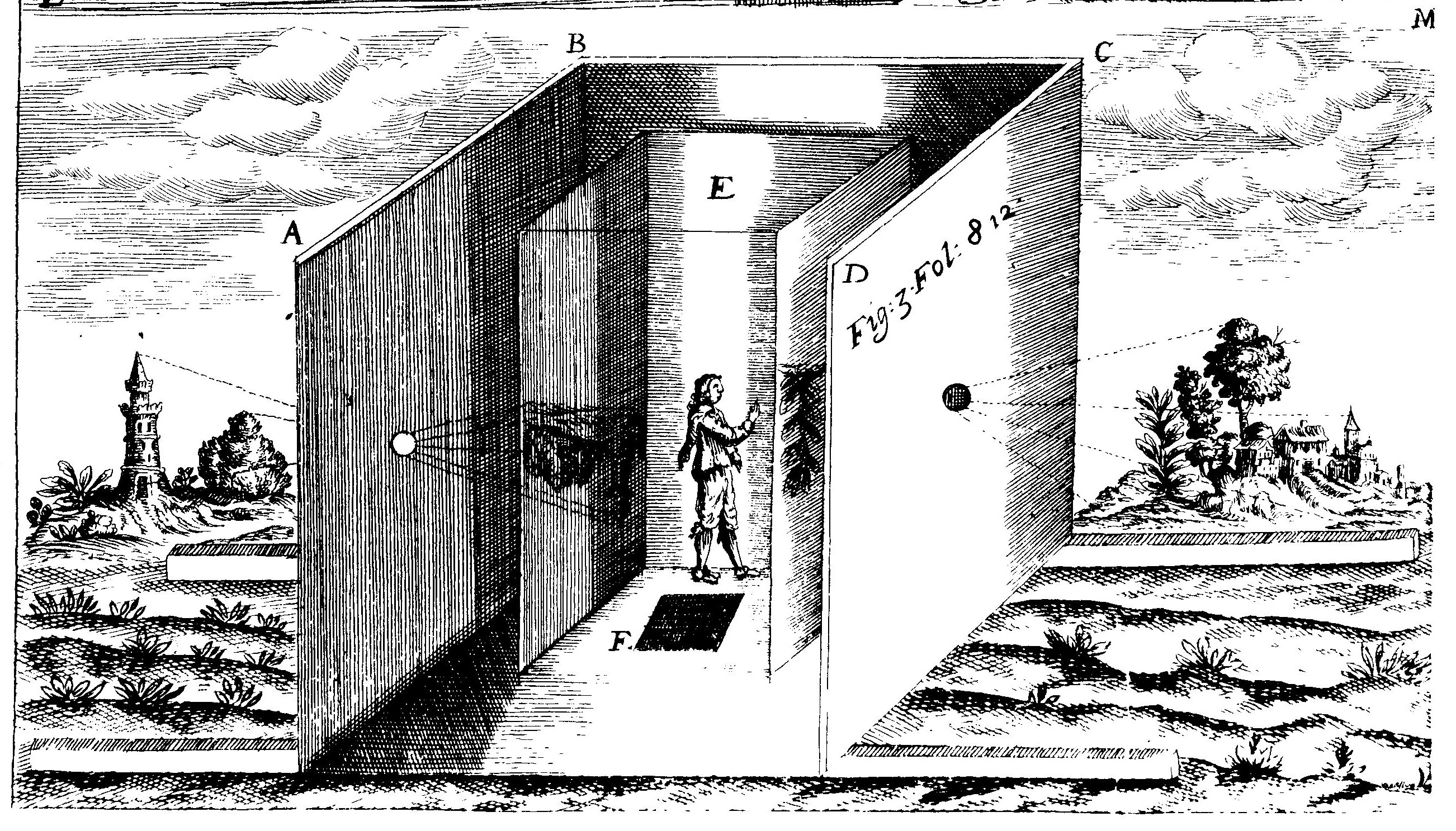
Illustration of a "portable" camera obscura studio in Kircher's Ars Magna Lucis Et Umbrae (1645). According to the Hockney–Falco thesis, such optical aids were central to much of the great art from the Renaissance period to the dawn of modern art.

The Hockney–Falco thesis is a controversial theory of art history that argues that advances in naturalism and accuracy in Western art since the early Renaissance were due primarily to optical aids such as the camera obscura, camera lucida, and curved mirrors, and that the use of these aids was more widespread than previously believed. The theory was proposed by artist David Hockney in 1999 and further advanced with physicist Charles M. Falco since 2000 (together as well as individually).

In his 2001 book, Secret Knowledge: Rediscovering the Lost Techniques of the Old Masters, Hockney more extensively analyzed the work of the Old Masters and argued that the level of accuracy represented in their work is impossible to create by "eyeballing it". It formed the basis for the 2002 BBC documentary David Hockney: Secret Knowledge, with some new ideas and experiments that in turn inspired additions to the second edition of the book (2006).

Nineteenth-century artists' use of photography had been well documented, and many art historians had already suggested that certain artists had used the camera obscura for their work (most notably 18th century painter Canaletto and 17th century painter Johannes Vermeer), but Hockney believed that nobody had previously suggested that optics had been used as early and widely as he suggested. Many art historians contested the hypothesis, while others described the response to it as "publicity hype" and pointed towards earlier studies and writings.

== Earlier incarnations ==
The hypothesis that technology was used in the production of Renaissance Art was not much in dispute in early studies and literature.

In his treatise on perspective, early Baroque painter Cigoli (1559 – 1613) expressed his belief that a more likely explanation of the origin of painting lies in people conserving the image of the camera obscura by applying colours and tracing the contours of the projected figures, rather than Pliny the Elder's traditional story about a Corinthian tracing the shadow of the profile of her departing lover.

In 1755, Charles-Antoine Jombert noted that it was said that many of the Flemish painters (presumably the Flemish Primitives) had studied and imitated the effect of the camera obscura. Just like Hockney, he pointed out that the optical image differs from the way people see things naturally.

The 1929 Encyclopædia Britannica contained an extensive article on the camera obscura and cited Leon Battista Alberti as the first documented user of the device as early as 1437. However, Alberti's "device" was probably a kind of peep box, and the kind of optical devices that he and Filippo Brunelleschi used, have been explained as means to demonstrate the rediscovered and enhanced application of Euclidean geometric perspective rather than drawing aids.

Aaron Scharf's 1968 book Art and Photography details evidence of the use of photographs and the camera by painters. Scharf notes in his introduction that in 1568 Daniele Barbaro, the Venetian writer on architecture, recommended the camera obscura as an aid to artists: "By holding the paper steady you can trace the whole perspective outline with a pen, shade it, and delicately colour it from nature."

David Lindberg's A Catalogue of Medieval and Renaissance Optical Manuscripts (Pontifical Institute of Medieval Studies, 1974) lists 61 manuscripts written in the years 1000–1425. These manuscripts not only describe methods for making mirrors and parabolic mirrors but also discuss their use for image projection.

In 1990, Shigeru Tsuji argued that Brunelleschi had used the camera obscura to paint the panel for the famous experiment that has usually been heralded as the origin of linear perspective.

In 1994, Roberta Lapucci proposed that Caravaggio's well-known use of mirrors evolved into the use of the camera obscura to reproduce the whole figure of a model, rather than the details and parts that the mirror-technique was used for.

== Origins of the thesis and early publications ==
Aaron Scharf's Art and Photography is referred to by Hockney in his 1977 painting My Parents (Tate, London) in which his father is depicted attentively reading the volume.

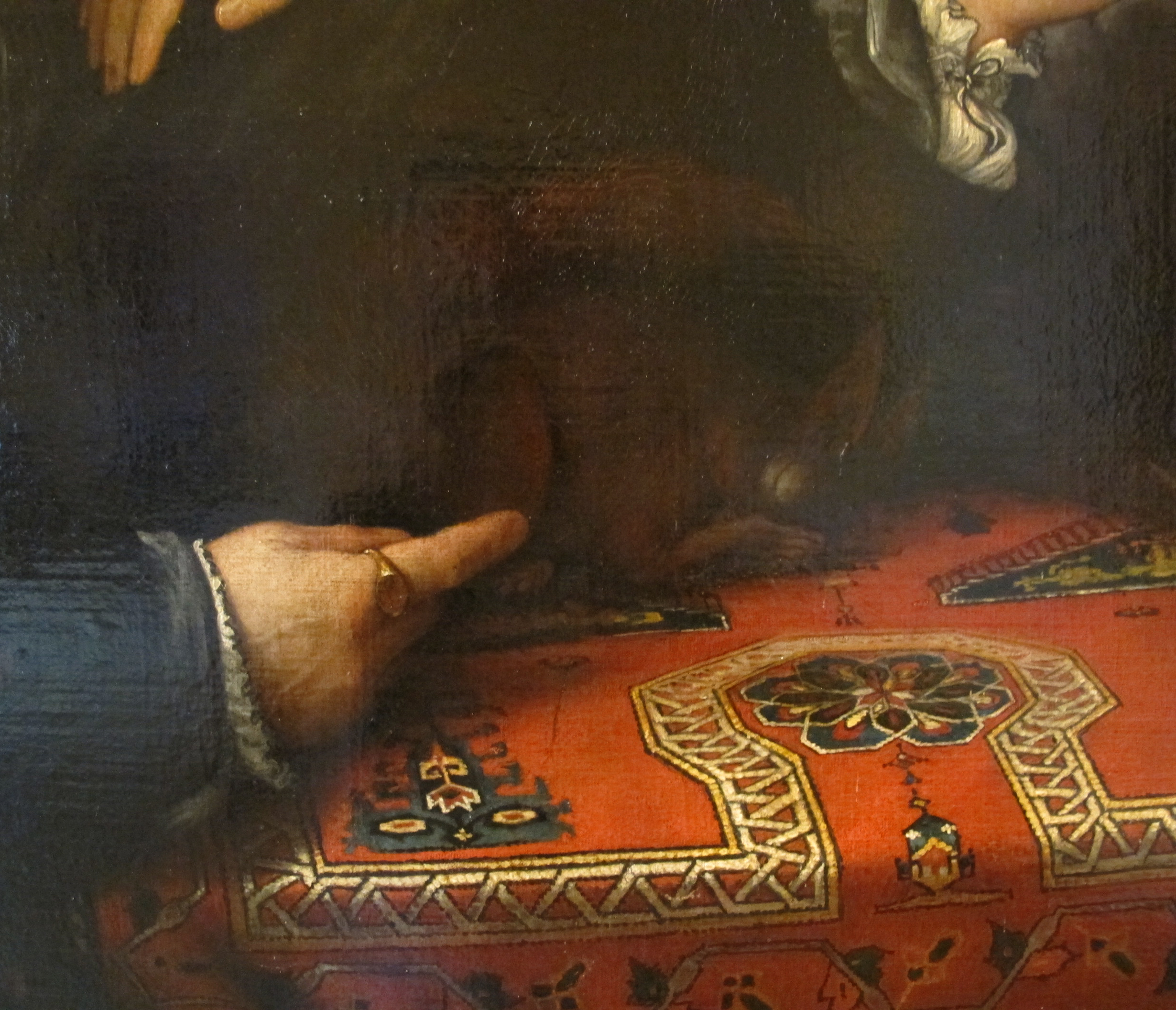
Detail from Husband and Wife by Lorenzo Lotto (1523): Hockney realized that the rug pattern goes out of focus in the painting, something that would only happen when using a lens.

As described in Secret Knowledge, in January 1999 during a visit to the National Gallery, London, Hockney was struck by the accuracy of the small portrait drawings by Jean Auguste Dominique Ingres, and by their resemblance to drawings by Andy Warhol that are known to have been traced from photographic images. He suspected that Ingres had used a camera lucida or similar device.

In June 1999, Hockney published in the Royal Academy magazine, speculating about Ingres using the camera lucida and Vincent van Gogh possibly using an epidiascope or other mechanical means for his painting of The Prisoners in the Courtyard, which very precisely reproduces Gustave Doré's engraving (although Hockney considered this could also be done with a squared-up copy). Hockney suggested that the relation between 19th century painting and photography had yet to be explored, and that the influence of the supposed veracity of photography was currently ending due to computer manipulation affecting the way people use and experience images.

Hockney began looking for signs of the use of optical aids in earlier paintings, creating what he called the Great Wall in his studio by organizing images of great naturalistic art by time period, which eventually seemed to display a sudden rise of naturalism around 1420. In March 2000, he showed the project to Charles Falco, a condensed matter physicist and an expert in optics. Falco became especially intrigued with Husband and Wife by Lorenzo Lotto (circa 1543), of which Hockney had enlarged a section of the pattern on the rug that seems to go out of focus. Falco suggested that the painting contained sufficient data to enable him to estimate the properties of the lens theorized to have been used for projection. He considered that such a calculation would provide the "smoking gun" of scientific evidence for the theory. Falco also noticed geometric pattern lines at the border of the rug that appear to imply different vanishing points, and he reasoned that this showed that, in addition to using a lens and projection to create this work, Lotto had refocused the lens when painting different sections of the carpet. (Hockney 2001, pp. 60, 254–257).

In July 2000, Falco and Hockney published "Optical Insights into Renaissance Art" in Optics & Photonics News, vol. 11, a detailed analysis of the likely use of concave mirrors in certain Renaissance paintings, particularly the Lotto painting. Experiments with a concave mirror (which technically is also a lens) of the calculated properties indeed produced a projected image that was bright and sharp enough to be of use to a painter. They also measured the distances between pupils in 12 examples of portraits with a "photographic quality" from between 1450 and 1565 and found that the pictures all had a magnification of ~90%, and the depicted heads and shoulders all stayed within a circumference of 30 to 50 cm, which corresponded with the sizes of sufficiently clear images projected with the mirror lens.

== Secret Knowledge ==
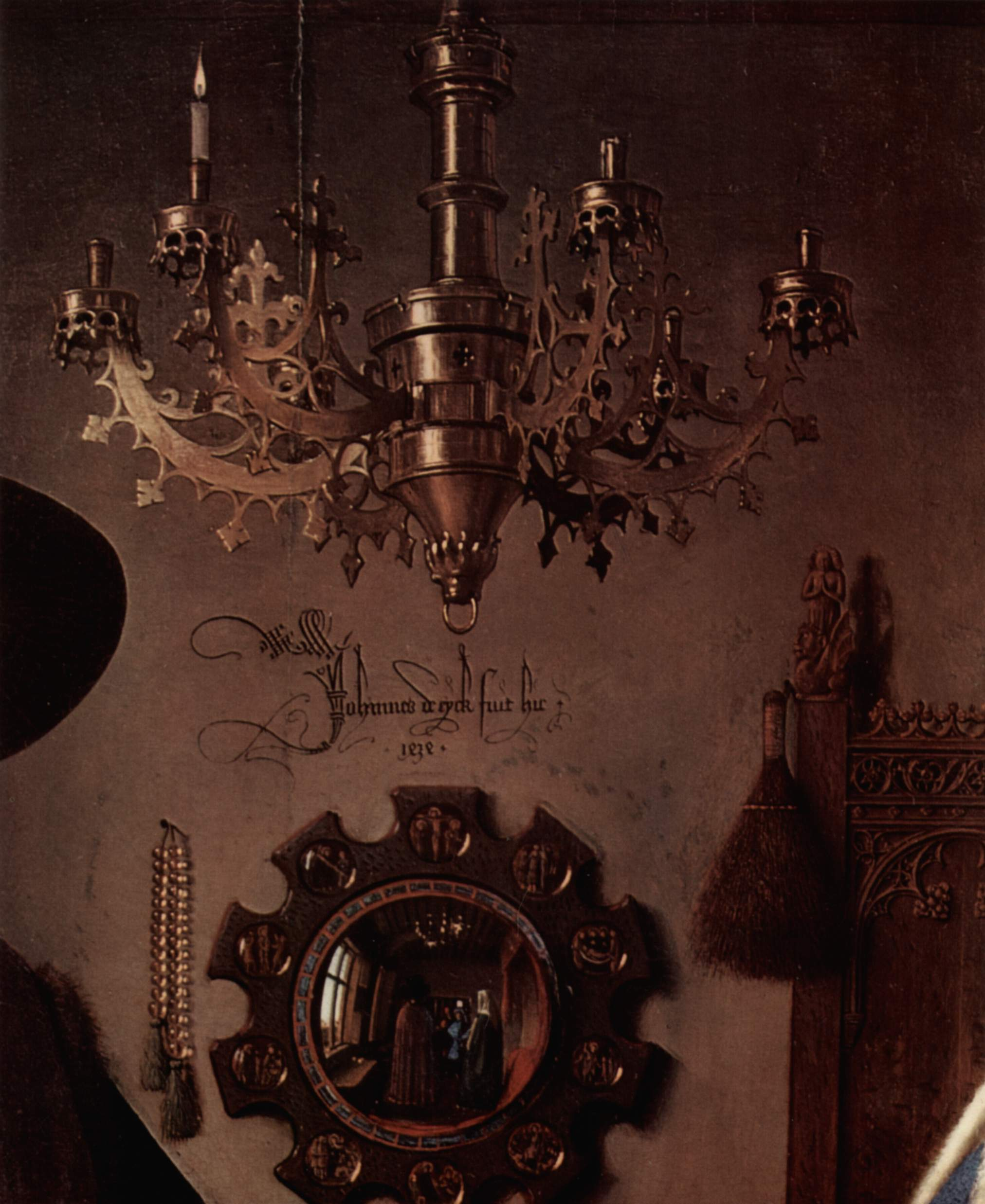
Detail of the chandelier and mirror from Jan van Eyck's 1434 Arnolfini Portrait, one of Hockney's key examples

In his book Secret Knowledge (2001), Hockney argues that early Renaissance artists such as Jan van Eyck and Lorenzo Lotto used concave mirrors; as evidence, he points to the chandelier in Van Eyck's Arnolfini Portrait, the ear in Van Eyck's portrait of Cardinal Albergati, and the carpet in Lotto's Husband and Wife. Hockney suggests that later artists, beginning with Caravaggio, used convex mirrors as well, to achieve a large field of view.

Secret Knowledge recounts Hockney's search for evidence of optical aids in the work of earlier artists, including the assembly of a "Great Wall" of the history of Western art. The 15th century work of Jan van Eyck seems to be the turning point, he argues, after which elements of realism became increasingly prominent. He correlates shifts toward increased realism with advances in optical technologies.

=== The optical look ===
Many details that are very difficult to depict by eyeballing them, seem remarkably naturalistically painted after the 15th century turning point. Hockney noticed for instance how patterns on clothes perfectly follow complex folds, while clothing previously was painted in a simple graphic manner. Foreshortened curved objects like lutes and pages of a book started to look very accurate in renaissance paintings. While such subjects would be extremely difficult to paint even with technical aids like the frame and chord method known from a 1525 woodcut by Dürer, it is much easier with optical projections (Hockney 2001 p. 36–57).

Hockney tested a technique with a small concave mirror projecting the view from a small open window onto a surface in a darkened room. He associated several of the limitations of the technique and the characteristics of the projected images with the look of many naturalistic paintings: strong lights and shadows, dark backgrounds, limited depth, and a head-on perspective. The use of strong light is also indicated by the small pupils in Van Eyck's portrait of cardinal Albergati, and Hockney suggested that the shelf and ledges at the bottom of many portraits and still lifes, as well as similarities in composition and lighting could be related to this "hole-in-the-wall" technique. According to Hockney, even the establishment of still life as a genre in the 15th and 16th centuries might be connected to the ease of using inanimate objects for the projected imagery. He stressed that not all the artists used the mirror-lens; many could have imitated the look from the works of those who did (p. 74–81, 104–112).

When lenses became large and good enough for wider projections with camera obscuras, artists would have recognised the advantage and Hockney believes this explains the very influential style of Caravaggio's paintings (p. 112).

=== Distortions ===
Hockney argued that the accurate anamorphic skull in Holbein's The Ambassadors (1533) could have been made with the help of a projection on a tilted surface (p. 57). He recognised less obvious distortions that could similarly (but incidentally) have been caused by a slight tilt of the canvas in the apparently "squeezed up" skull in Francisco de Zurbarán's St. Franciscus at Prayer (circa 1638–39), and in the figure of Jan van Bylert's Man in Armour Holding a Pike (circa 1630) (p. 179).

==== Montage technique ====
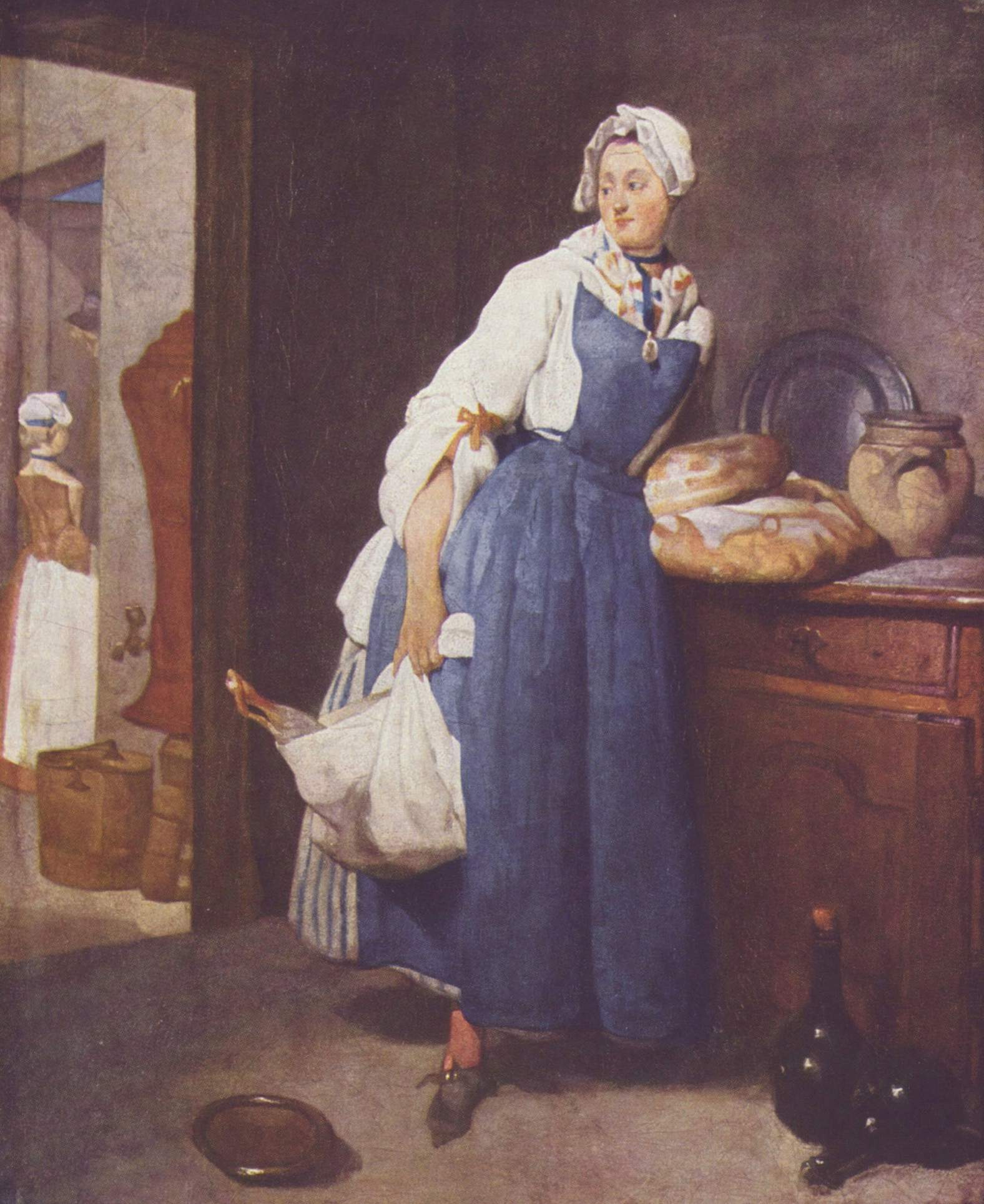
Jean Siméon Chardin's "La Pourvoyeuse" (1738) seems to have a very long arm with two elbows, possibly from piecing together consecutive projections of different parts of the figure

Hockney suggested that master painters who used projections would often piece together their compositions from different elements. Most elements would be drawn or painted from a straight on viewpoint, although this doesn't always match their place in the linear perspective of the overall composition. The consecutive projections of the different parts sometimes seem to have caused distorted proportions that are not immediately obvious, but would not as soon occur if the master would have sketched out the composition by eye (pp. 112,172–177)

== Further publications by Hockney and Falco ==
After their initial papers and Hockney's book, Hockney and Falco continued publishing about their theory.

At a scientific conference in February 2007, Falco argued that the Arabic physicist Ibn al-Haytham's (965–1040) work on optics, in his Book of Optics, may have influenced the use of optical aids by Renaissance artists. Falco said that his and Hockney's examples of Renaissance art "demonstrate a continuum in the use of optics by artists from c. 1430, arguably initiated as a result of Ibn al-Haytham's influence, until today."

== Reception ==
The thesis prompted intense and sustained debate among artists, art historians, and a wide variety of other scholars. In particular, it has spurred increased interest in the actual methods and techniques of artists among scientists and historians of science, as well as general historians and art historians. The latter have in general reacted unfavorably, interpreting the Hockney–Falco thesis as an accusation that the Old Masters "cheated" and intentionally obscured their methods.

Art historians and others have criticized Hockney's argument on the grounds that the use of optical aids, though well-established in individual cases, has little value for explaining the overall development of Western art, and that historical records and paintings and photographs of art studios (without optical devices), as well as present-day realist artists, demonstrate that high levels of realism are possible without optical aids. Criminisi and Stork enlisted a contemporary artist to create a chandelier painting similar to the detail found in Arnolfini Portrait by eye as part of their response to the thesis, which they found to have a similar level of accuracy. Hockney ignored the history of linear perspective and the developments towards realism in sculpture that seem independent of any intervention by discoveries concerning optics.

=== Optical distortion ===
In addition to incredulity on the part of art historians and critics of modern art, some of the harshest criticism of the Hockney–Falco thesis came from another expert in optics, image processing and pattern recognition, David G. Stork. Stork analyzed the images used by Falco and Hockney, and came to the conclusion that they do not demonstrate the kinds of optical distortion that curved mirrors or converging lenses would cause. Falco has responded that Stork's published criticisms have relied on fabricated data and misrepresentations of Hockney and Falco's theory. Stork has rebutted this.

=== Renaissance optics ===
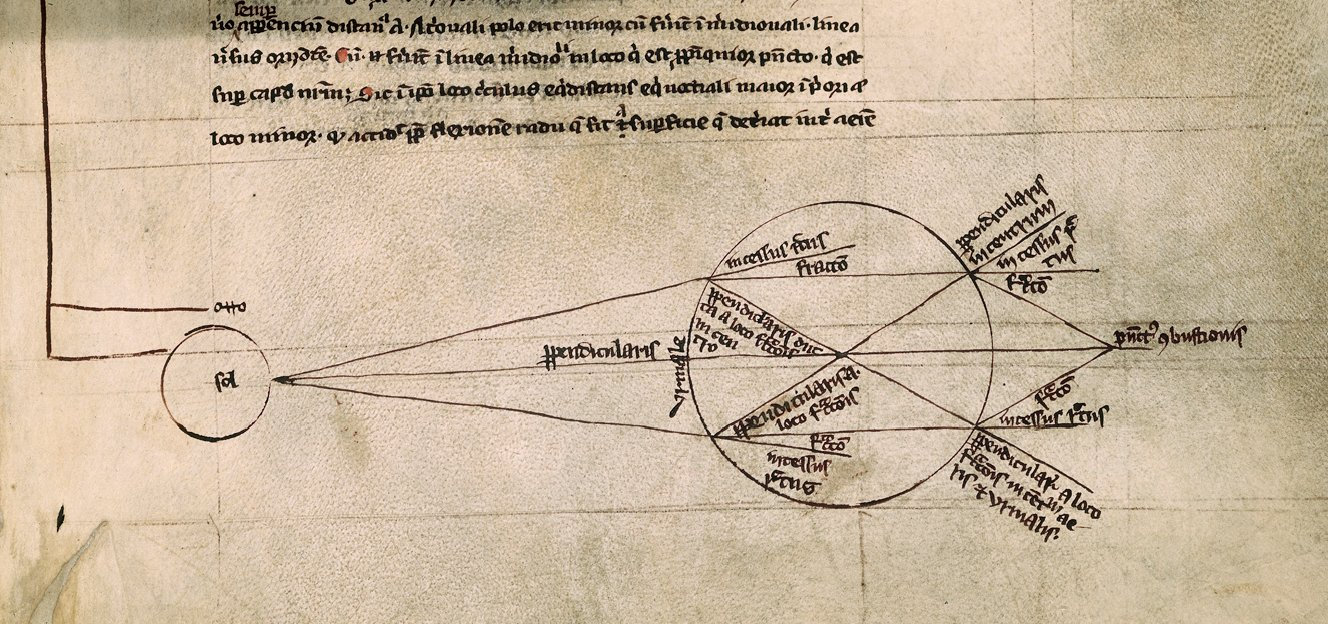
Diagram illustrating Grosseteste's theory, in De Nat. Loc. (see pp. 122, 149) of the focusing of the sun's rays by a spherical lens; from Roger Bacon's Opus Maius, late 13th century

Critics of the Hockney–Falco theory say the quality of mirrors and optical glass for the period before 1550 and a lack of textual evidence (excluding paintings themselves as "documentary evidence") of their use for image projection during this period cast doubt on the theory. Historians are more inclined to agree about the possible relevance of the thesis between 1550 and the invention of the telescope, and cautiously supportive after that period, when there clearly was interest and capacity to project realistic images; 17th century painters such as Johannes Vermeer and Gaspar van Wittel used optical devices in a variety of ways, though not the ways postulated by Hockney.

Leaving the technical optical arguments aside, historians of science investigated several aspects of the historical plausibility of the thesis in a 2005 set of articles in Early Science and Medicine. In his introduction to the volume, Sven Dupré claimed the Hockney–Falco analysis rests heavily on a small number of examples, "a few dozen square centimeters" of canvas that seem to show signs that optical devices were used.

=== Image projection ===
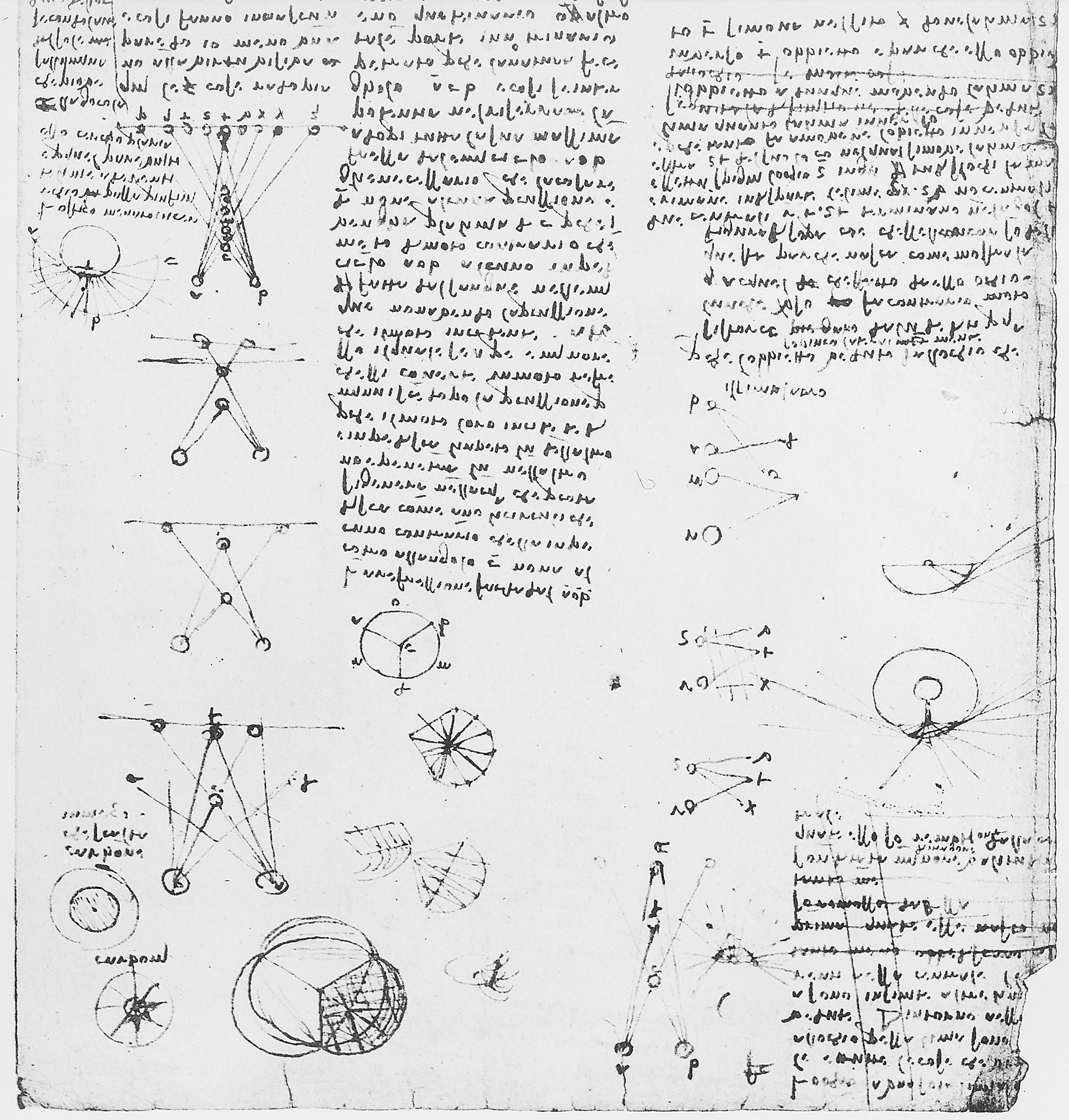
Leonardo da Vinci: "On the eye and vision"

Leonardo da Vinci's notebooks include several designs for creating concave mirrors. Leonardo also describes a camera obscura in his Codex Atlanticus of 1478–1519.

The camera obscura was well known for centuries and documented by Ibn al-Haitham in his Book of Optics of 1011–1021. In 13th-century England Roger Bacon described the use of a camera obscura for the safe observation of solar eclipses, exactly because the viewer looks at the projected image and not the sun itself.

=== Optical glass ===
Sara J. Schechner argued that surviving glassware from the 15th and 16th centuries is far too imperfect to have been used to create realistic images, while "even thinking about projecting images was alien to the contemporary conceptual frame of mind." Vincent Ilardi, a historian of Renaissance optical glass, subsequently argued against Schechner's conclusions based on surviving glassware, suggesting that the present condition of Renaissance glassware is not likely to reflect the optical quality of such glassware when it was new. Ilardi documents Lorenzo Lotto's purchase of a high-priced crystal mirror in 1549, bolstering the Hockney–Falco thesis in Lotto's case.

Furthermore, even normal eyeglasses (spectacles) can also project images of sufficient optical quality to support the Hockney–Falco thesis and such eyeglasses, along with magnifying glasses and mirrors, were not only available at the time, but actually pictured in 14th century paintings by artists such as Tommaso da Modena.

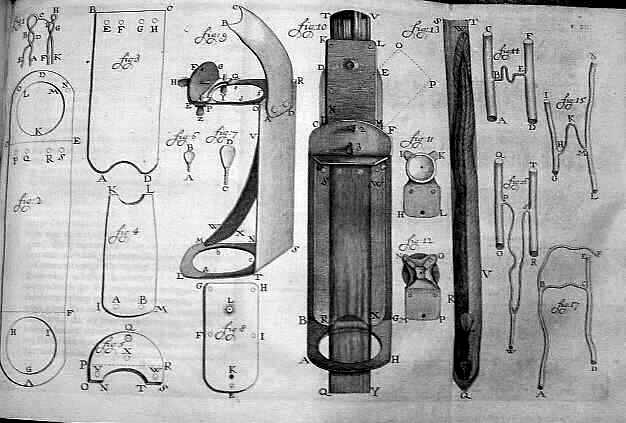
Van Leeuwenhoek's microscopes depicted by Henry Baker

Dutch draper and pioneering microbiologist Antonie van Leeuwenhoek (1632–1723), a contemporary of artist Vermeer (and an executor for Vermeer when he died in 1675) in Delft was known to have exceptional lens making skills, having created single small lenses capable of 200× magnification, far exceeding those of more complex compound microscopes of the period. Indeed, his feats of lens making were not matched for a considerable time as he kept aspects of their construction secret; in the 1950s, C. L. Stong used thin glass thread fusing instead of polishing to recreate Leeuwenhoek design microscopes. It was long believed that Antonie van Leeuwenhoek was a master lens grinder (a notion repeated in a BBC television documentary Cell). However, it is now believed that he came upon a relatively simple method of making small, high quality glass spheres by heating and manipulating a small rod of soda lime glass.

=== Metal mirrors ===
On his website, Falco also claims Schechner overlooked manuscript evidence for the use of mirrors made from steel and other metals, as well as numerous metal artifacts that belie the claim that sufficiently large and reflective metal mirrors were unavailable, and that other contributors to the Early Science and Medicine volume relied on Schechner's mistaken work in dismissing the thesis.

=== Evidence of earlier use of optical tools ===
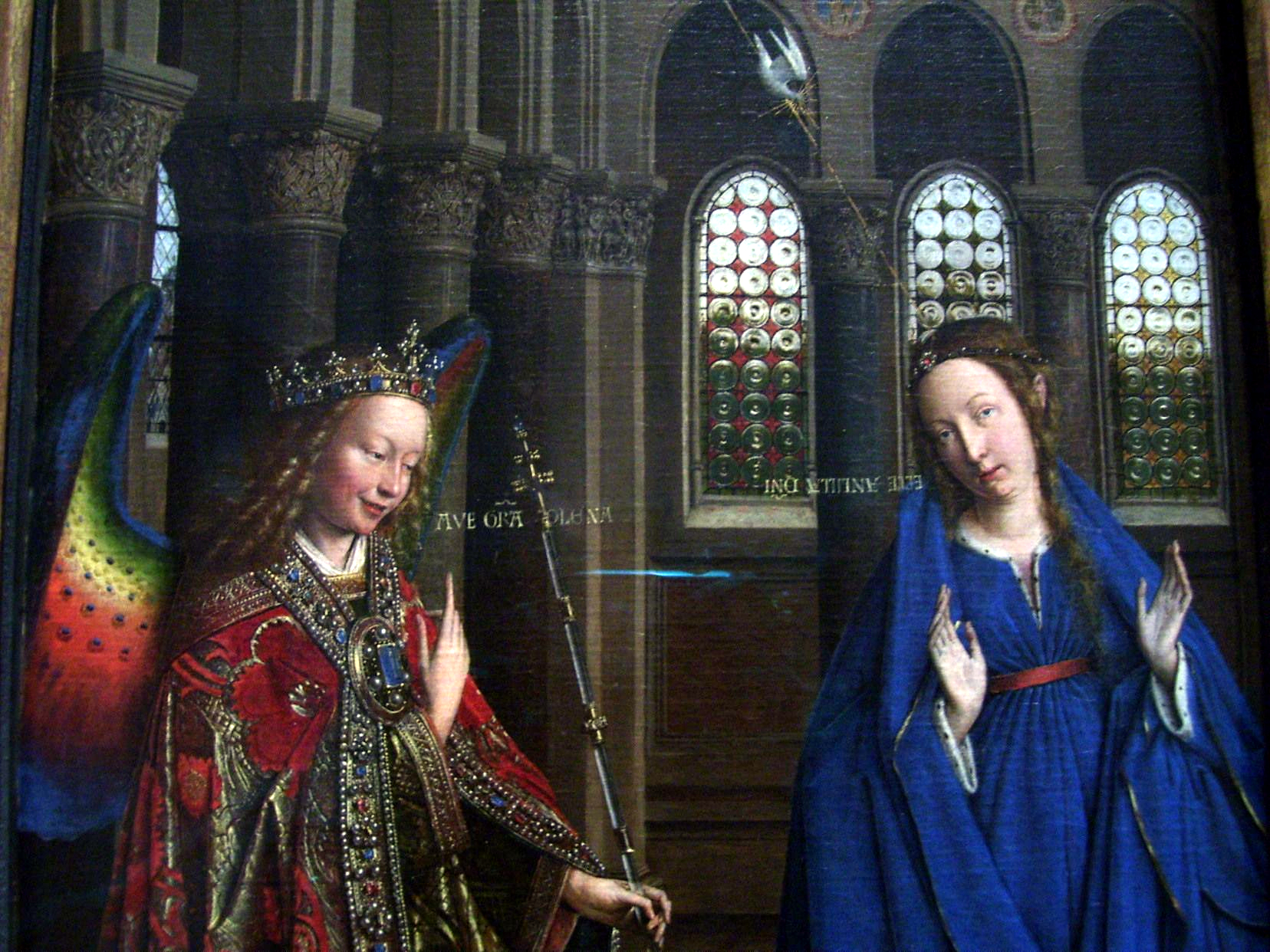
Detail of the Annunciation, van Eyck, 1434–1436, Washington, with three crown glass windows behind Mary

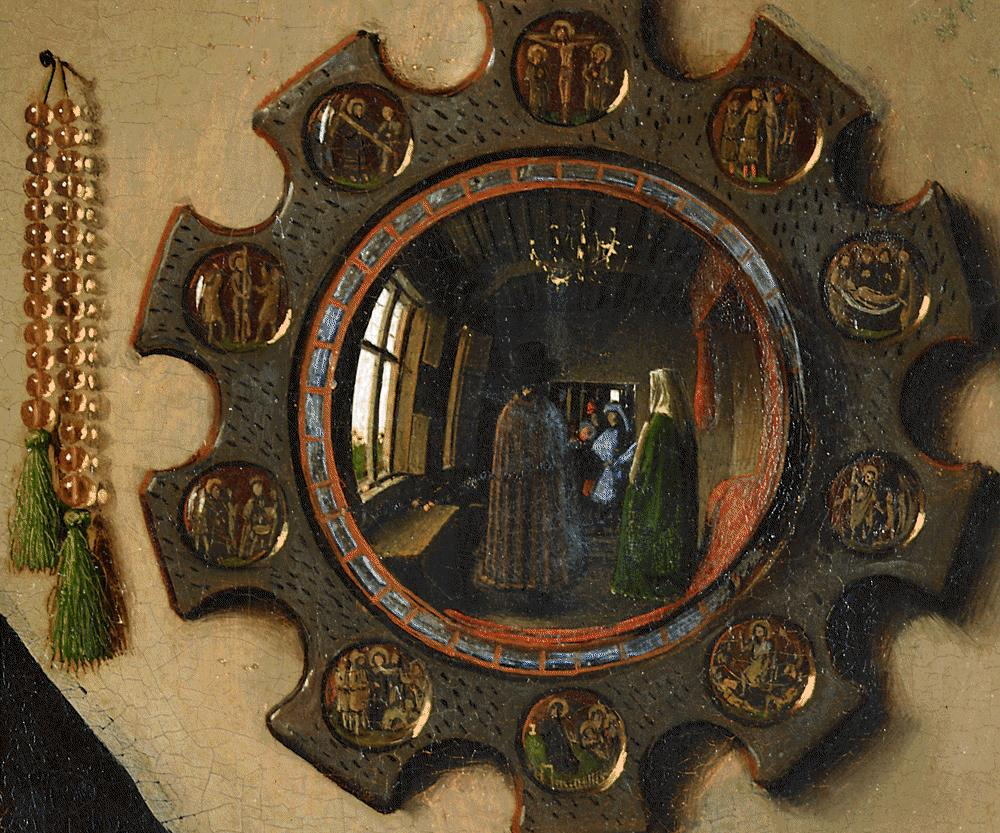
Mirror depicted in the 1434 Arnolfini Portrait

Don Ihde called the hypothesis being 'hyped' and referred to clear evidence about the use of optical tools by, e.g., Albrecht Dürer and Leonardo da Vinci and others. As well the 1929 Encyclopædia Britannica contains an extensive article on the camera obscura and cites Leon Battista Alberti as the first documented user of the device as early as 1437. Ihde states abundant evidence for widespread use of various technical devices at least in the Renaissance and e.g. in Early Netherlandish painting. Jan van Eyck's 1434 painting Arnolfini Portrait shows a convex mirror in the centre of the painting. Van Eyck also left his signature above this mirror, showing the importance of the tool. The painting includes a crown glass window in the upper left side, a rather expensive luxury at the time. Van Eyck was rather fascinated by glass and its qualities, which was as well of high symbolic importance for his contemporaries. Early optical instruments were comparatively expensive in the Medieval age and the Renaissance.

== Legacy ==
Although experts mostly recognised little new or convincing evidence in the Hockney–Falco thesis, the publicity surrounding it increased the attention to the relation between optics and art, and several more rigorous, scholarly studies on the subject have since been published.

For instance, there was the case of the decade-long research on Rembrandt's works conducted by painter Francis O'Neill. In the published paper he wrote with Sofia Palazzo Corner entitled, Rembrandt's Self-portraits, O'Neill presented recurring themes in the painter's works that serve as evidence in his use of mirrors, particularly, in his self-portraits. These include the use of chiaroscuro, which is a signature of the lighting conditions necessary for projections as well as Rembrandt's off-center gaze in his self-portraits, which - according to O'Neill - indicated that the artist might have been looking at a projection surface off to the side rather than straight onto a flat mirror.

The large 2020 Van Eyck exhibition in Ghent was subtitled "An Optical Revolution", but the accompanying information and published book clarified how experts attribute his remarkable naturalism to scientific knowledge of optics (presumably through works like those of Euclid, Ptolemy and especially Ibn al-Haytham) rather than the use of optical aids.

== See also ==
- Tim's Vermeer, a 2013 documentary film showing Tim Jenison's hypothesis: Vermeer might have created his paintings aided by an optical device, as Jenison demonstrates by recreating a Vermeer painting.
