= Opaque projector =

Optical device

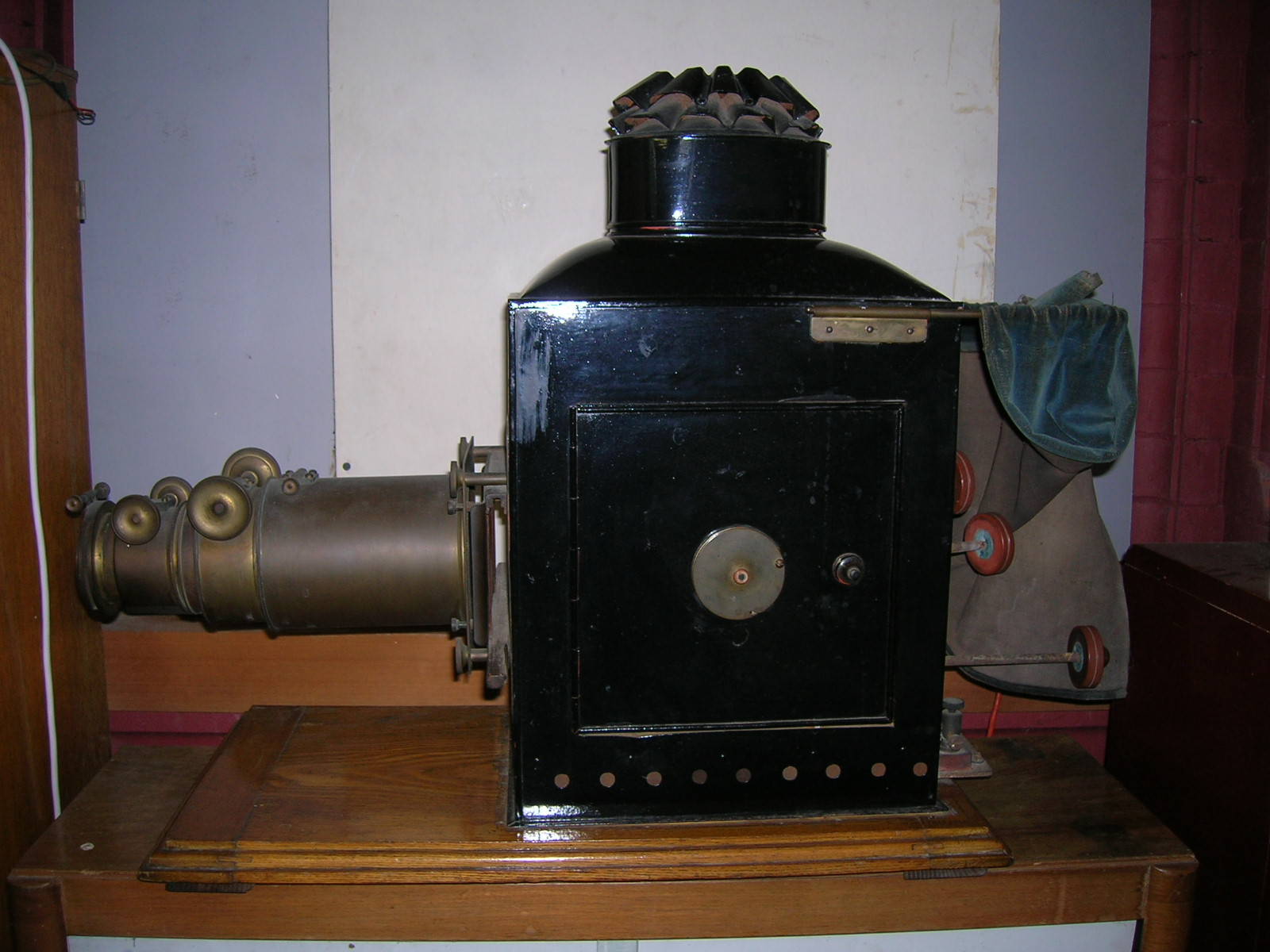
An episcope which was used in a University of Cambridge lecture hall in the late 1800s

The opaque projector, or episcope is a device which displays opaque materials by shining a bright lamp onto the object from above. The episcope must be distinguished from the diascope, which is a projector used for projecting images of transparent objects (such as films), and from the epidiascope, which is capable of projecting images of both opaque and transparent objects.

A system of mirrors, prisms and/or imaging lenses is used to focus an image of the material onto a viewing screen. Because they must project the reflected light, opaque projectors require brighter bulbs and larger lenses than overhead projectors. Care must be taken that the materials are not damaged by the heat generated by the light source. Opaque projectors are not as common as the overhead projector.

Opaque projectors are typically used to project images of book pages, drawings, mineral specimens, leaves, etc. They have been produced and marketed as artists' enlargement tools to allow images to be transferred to surfaces such as prepared canvas, or for lectures and discourses.

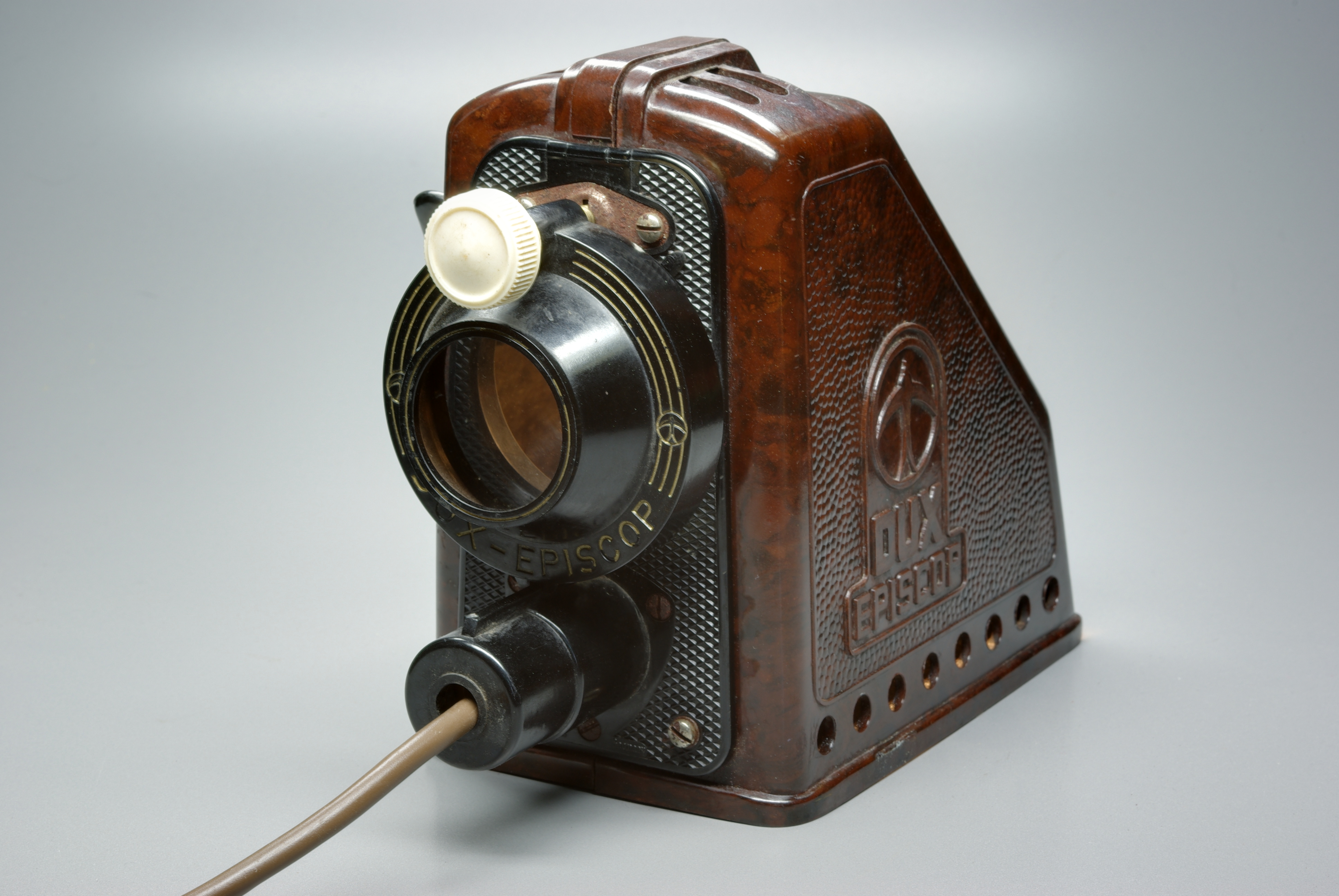
Small episcope for home use

== History ==
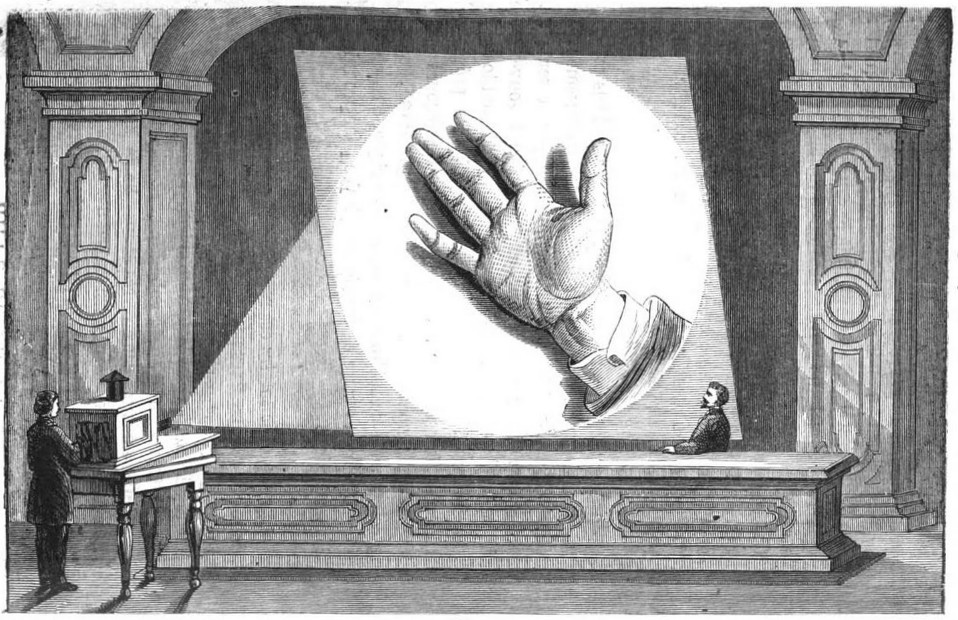
Henry Morton's projection as illustrated in François Moigno's L'art des projections (1872)

Swiss mathematician, physicist, astronomer, logician and engineer Leonhard Euler demonstrated an opaque projector around 1756. It could project a clear image of opaque images and (small) objects. French scientist Jacques Charles is thought to have invented the similar "megascope" in 1780. He used it for his lectures. Around 1872 Henry Morton used an opaque projector in demonstrations for huge audiences, for example in the Philadelphia Opera House which could seat 3500 people. His machine did not use a condenser or reflector, but used an oxyhydrogen lamp close to the object in order to project huge clear images.

The light source in early opaque projectors was often limelight. Incandescent light bulbs and halogen lamps are most commonly used today.

In the early and middle parts of the 20th century, low-cost opaque projectors were produced and marketed as toys for children.

In educational settings, the specific role of the opaque projector has been superseded first by the overhead projector and later the document camera, a lighted table with a fixed video camera above it. The image from the camera is displayed using a separate projector. The document camera is also called a desktop presenter unit or opaque projector.

Opaque projectors are still in use for tracing, called tracing projectors. A flat or solid original is projected on a larger sheet of paper onto a wall or easel, where the artist or craftsperson can trace the outline reliably.

== Types ==
At the beginning of the 20th century, projection was split into two classes: "If the light traverses the object, the projection is said to be diascopic, if by reflected light, episcopic."

Two main classes of opaque projectors thus existed:

- the episcope, which solely projected images of opaque objects
- the epidiascope, which was capable of projecting images of both opaque and transparent images

== See also ==
- Camera lucida
- Projector (disambiguation) for a directory of projector types.
- Telop
