= Photo slideshow software =

Software

Photo slideshow software is computer software used to display a range of digital photos, images and video clips in a predefined order. In most cases the output file is a standard video file or an executable file which contains all the sound and images for display.

== Typical features ==
Slideshow applications usually offer the following functions: image editing (including photo enhancement, cropping, brightness & contrast settings, photo vintage effects), special animation effects (Ken Burns Effects, rotation, 3D flips), transitions, a collection of pre-designed images (clip art), background music soundtrack, opening and closing titles, voice-over recording, text captions, etc.

Some programs have the ability to search and import images from Flickr or Google. Custom graphics can also be created in other programs such as Adobe Photoshop or Adobe Illustrator and then exported to a slideshow maker.

== Software ==
- PhotoStage

== See also ==
- Slide show
- Presentation program
- Non-linear editing
- Comparison of image viewers
- Audiovisual education
- Showcase Presentations
- Wireless clicker
