= Edit (given name) =

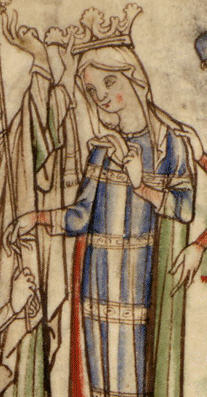
Edith of Wessex

Edit is a feminine given name related to Edith. It may refer to:

== Women ==
- Edit Balázsovits (born 1975), Hungarian actress and singer
- Edit Bauer (born 1946), Hungarian politician from Slovakia
- Edit Bérces (born 1964), Hungarian ultramarathon runner
- Edit DeAk (1948–2017), Hungarian-born American art critic and writer
- Edit Doron (1951–2019), Israeli linguist
- Edit Éva Farkas (born 1959), Hungarian lichenologist and mycologist
- Edit Gláz (1926–2020), Hungarian endocrinologist
- Edit Hajós, the birth name of Edith Bone, medical professional, journalist and translator
- Edit Herczog (born 1961), Hungarian politician
- Edit Kindvall (1866–1951), Swedish teacher, photographer, women's rights activist and suffragist
- Edit Bán Kiss (1905–1966), Hungarian sculptor and painter
- Edit Klocker (born 1979), Hungarian swimmer
- Edit Kovács (fencer) (born 1954), Hungarian fencer
- Edit Kovács (swimmer) (born 1951), Hungarian swimmer
- Edit Láng (Gyuláné Krizsán-Bilek, born 1938), Hungarian chess Woman International Master
- Edit Gyömrői Ludowyk (1896–1987), Hungarian psychotherapist, poet and communist
- Edit Machlik (born 1997), Norwegian footballer and chess player
- Edit Makedonska, Bulgarian-Serbian violinist
- Edit Matei (born 1964 as Edit Török), Hungarian handballer from Romania
- Edit Mató (1947–2020), Hungarian ice dancer
- Edit Miklós (born 1988), Hungarian alpine ski racer from Romania
- Edit Molnár (born 1965), Hungarian sprinter
- Edit Perényi-Weckinger (1923–2019), Hungarian gymnast
- Edit Punk (born 1967), Hungarian rower
- Edit Sági, Hungarian table tennis player
- Edit Schlaffer (born 1950), Austrian social scientist and founder of Women Without Borders
- Edit Soós (1934–2008), Hungarian actress
- Edit Stift (born 1980), Hungarian rower
- Edit Tasnádi (born 1942), Hungarian orientalist, literary translator and academic
- Edit Terästö (1913–2004), Finnish politician
- Edit Urban (born 1961), Hungarian table tennis player
- Edit Vári (born 1975), Hungarian sprint hurdler

== Men ==
- Edit Savio (born 1992), Timorese footballer

== Fictional characters ==
- Edit "Eddie" Janko-Reagan, a police officer in the TV series Blue Bloods
- Edit Stefanović, protagonist of the 2009 Serbian animated film Technotise: Edit & I
