= The Edit =

The Edit may refer to:

- The Edit (film), a 1985 short film
- The Edit, a fashion magazine published by Net-a-Porter

== See also ==
- Edit (disambiguation)
