= Presentation =

Process of presenting a topic to an audience

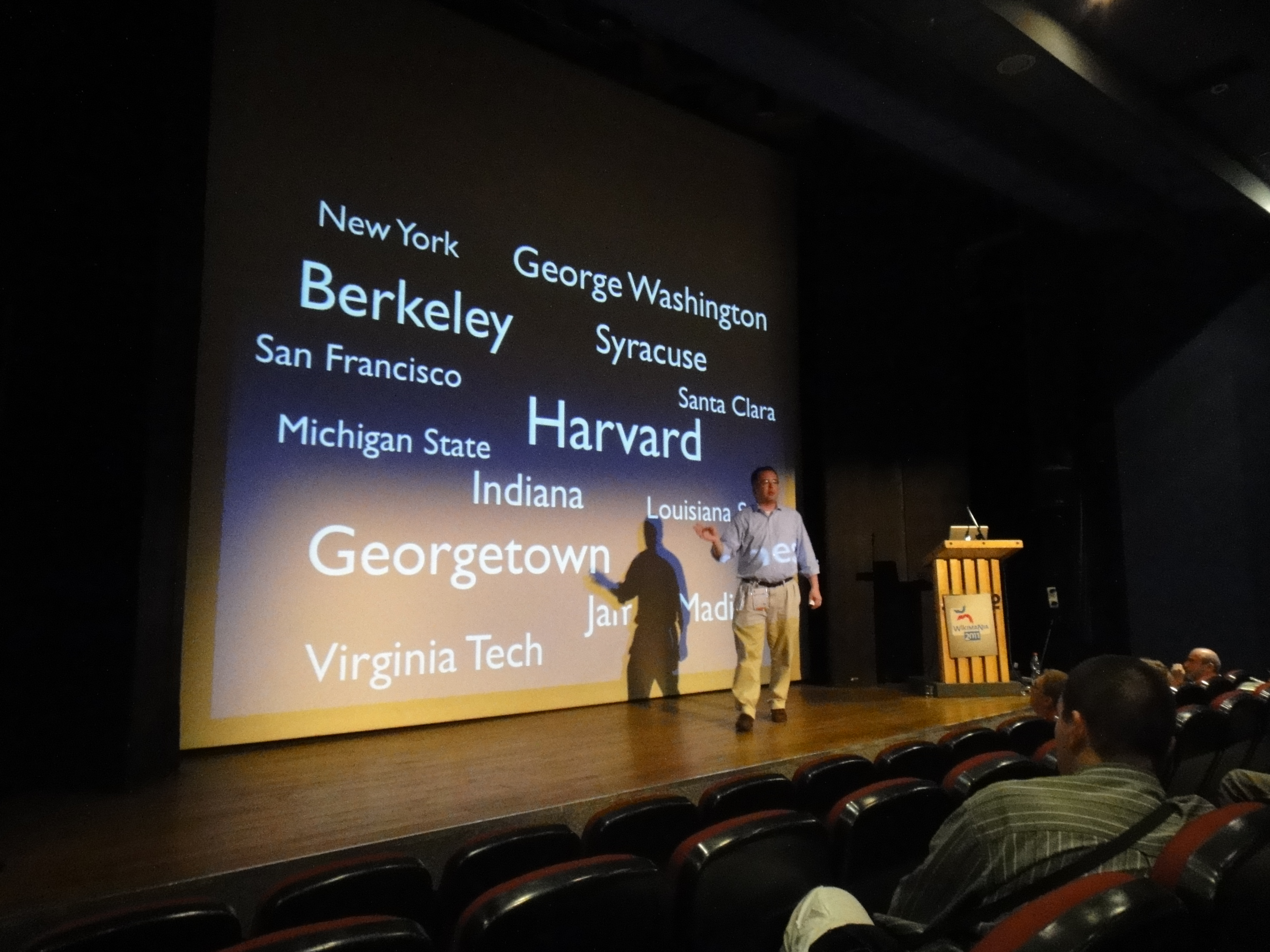
A speaker giving a presentation using a projector.

A presentation conveys information from a speaker to an audience. Presentations are typically demonstrations, introduction, lecture, or speech meant to inform, persuade, inspire, motivate, build goodwill, or present a new idea/product. Presentations usually require preparation, organization, event planning, writing, use of visual aids, dealing with stress, and answering questions. "The key elements of a presentation consists of presenter, audience, message, reaction and method to deliver speech for organizational success in an effective manner."

Presentations are widely used in tertiary work settings such as accountants giving a detailed report of a company's financials or an entrepreneur pitching their venture idea to investors. The term can also be used for a formal or ritualized introduction or offering, as with the presentation of a debutante.

Presentations in certain formats are also known as keynote address. Interactive presentations, in which the audience is involved, are also represented more and more frequently. Instead of a monologue, this creates a dialogue between the speaker and the audience. The advantages of an interactive presentation is for example, that it attracts more attention from the audience and that the interaction creates a sense of community.

== Visual elements ==
Presentation software is commonly used to generate the presentation content. Content such as text, images, links, and effects are added into each of the presentation programs to deliver useful, consolidated information to a group. Visual elements add to the effectiveness of a presentation and help emphasize the key points being made through the use of type, color, images/videos, graphs, layout, and transitions.

=== Legibility ===
One common means to help one convey information and the audience stay on track is through the incorporation of text in a legible font size and type. According to the article "Prepare and Deliver an Effective Presentation", effective presentations typically use serif fonts (e.g. Times New Roman, Garamond, Baskerville, etc.) for the smaller text and sans serif fonts (e.g. Helvetica, Futura, Arial, etc.) for headings and larger text. The typefaces are used along with type size to improve readability for the audience. A combination of these typefaces can also be used to create emphasis. The majority of the fonts within a presentation are kept simple to aid in readability. Font styles, like bold, italic, and underline, are used to highlight important points.

It is possible to emphasize text and still maintain its readability by using contrasting colors. For example, black words on a white background emphasize the text being displayed but still helps maintain its readability. Text that contrasts with the background of a slide also enhances visibility. Readability and visibility enhance a presentation experience, which contributes to the effectiveness of it. Certain colors are also associated with specific emotions and the proper application of these colors adds to the effectiveness of a presentation through the creation of an immersive experience for an audience.

=== Images/videos ===
Large images relevant to the presentation attract an audience's attention which in turn can clarify the topics within the presentation. Using pictures sparingly helps support other presentation elements (e.g. text). Short videos are used to help the presenter reinforce their message to the audience. With the additional reinforcement that images and videos offer, the effectiveness of a presentation may be improved.

== Assessing presentations ==
There lacks a comprehensive list of criteria common among research studies or educational institutions in a typical presentation rubric used to assess presentations. Nevertheless, De Grez et al., in consultation with experienced higher education teachers, developed a rubric composed of nine evaluative criteria, of which five dealt with one's manner of delivery (interaction with audience, enthusiasm, eye contact, vocal delivery, and body language), three were content related (structure, quality of introduction, and conclusion), and one evaluated general professionalism.

== See also ==
- Audience response
- Audiovisual education
- Showcase Presentations
- Slide show
- Wireless clicker
- List of presentation programs
