= Slide Effect =

- Developer(s): Devsoft
- Stable release: 1.11.0 / May 15, 2013; 12 years ago
- Operating system: Windows
- Type: Presentation program
- Website: http://www.slide-effect.com

Slide Effect is a presentation tool providing enhanced transitions and effects. Using a standard Presentation Software user interface, people can create slide presentation with movies and images in a simpler way than using a video editing software.

== History ==
First version of Slide Effect was originally created in April 2008. It was then nominated to the Epsilon Awards 2008 and in April 2009, a Pro edition has been released.

Devsoft is based in Switzerland.

== Main Features ==
- Support for main images and movies formats.
- Output as movie, Flash Video, executable or screensaver.
- Professional edition is able to read/write PowerPoint files.

== See also ==
- Slideshow
- Presentation Software
- Video editing software
- Screensaver
