= Ken Burns effect =

Filmography technique

The Ken Burns effect is a type of panning and zooming technique used in film and video production from non-consecutive still images. The name derives from extensive use of the technique by American documentarian Ken Burns. This technique had also been used to produce animatics, simple animated mockups used to previsualize motion pictures, but Burns's name has become associated with the effect in much the same way as Alfred Hitchcock is associated with the dolly zoom.

The feature enables a widely used technique of embedding still photographs in motion pictures, displayed with slow zooming and panning effects, and fading transitions between frames.

== Usage ==
The technique is principally used when film or video material is not available. Action is given to still photographs by slowly zooming in on subjects of interest and panning from one subject to another. For example, in a photograph of a baseball team, one might slowly pan across the faces of the players and come to a rest on the player the narrator is discussing. By employing simulated parallax, a two-dimensional image can appear as 3D, with the viewpoint seeming to enter the picture and move among the figures.

The effect can be used as a transition between clips as well. For example, to segue from one person in the story to another, a clip might open with a close-up of one person in a photo, then zoom out so that another person in the photo becomes visible. The zooming and panning across photographs gives the feeling of motion, and keeps the viewer visually engaged.

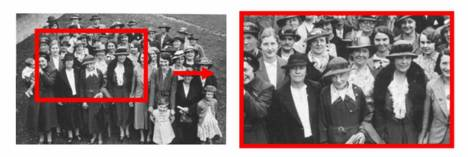
Instead of showing a large static photo on screen, the Ken Burns effect crops to a detail, then pans across the image.

Many styles of limited animation also use still-image panning to compensate for a lack of movement on-screen: one example is the American animation studio Filmation, which frequently used panning as a way to cut costs and fill time. In Japanese anime production, a cel that is meant to be held and panned is called a "hold cel" and marked in production with the word "tome" (止メ).

== Origins ==
Burns has credited documentary filmmaker Jerome Liebling for teaching him how still photographs could be incorporated into documentary films. He has also cited the 1957 National Film Board of Canada documentary City of Gold, co-directed by Colin Low and Wolf Koenig, as a prior example of the technique. Winner of the Palme d'Or at the Cannes Film Festival and nominated for an Academy Award, City of Gold used animation camera techniques to slowly pan and zoom across archival still pictures of Canada's Klondike Gold Rush.

America's television audience had seen extensive use of the technique in NBC's Meet Mr. Lincoln, first telecast 11 February 1959. This one-hour Abraham Lincoln documentary used period photographs, illustrations, artwork, newspapers and documents "animated" by the camera on an elaborate flatbed motion picture apparatus, and the descriptive term "stills in motion" for the technique was used in NBC's publicity and in the trade by the early 1960s.

In a 1961 letter to The New York Times, photographer and filmmaker Louis Clyde Stoumen surveyed earlier uses of the technique by himself and others:

Curt Oertel made his Michaelangelo, with important storytelling use of still material, in 1940 (released as Robert Flaherty's The Titan around 1949). Belgium's Henri Starc began imparting dramatic film form to still images in 1936, and his lyric World of Paul Delvaux (1947) is an acknowledged classic. Paul Haesaerts made Rubens in 1948. Americans Paul Falkenberg and Lewis Jacobs made Lincoln Speaks at Gettysburg entirely out of nineteenth-century engravings, 1950. Ben Berg and Herbert Block of Hollywood have for years been making a series of story-telling dramas out of paintings and prints, including a life story of Goya. I myself pioneered the dramatic use of still photographs (rather than paintings or prints) in a story-telling sequence for Arch Oboler's 1950 Columbia feature Five, and have for more than a decade continued development of this form—in my independent feature The Naked Eye (1956), the featurette The True Story of the Civil War (an Academy Award winner, 1956), Warner Brothers' The James Dean Story (1957), and most recently [...] for [...] ABC-TV's Winston Churchill, the Valiant Years.

== Implementation ==
Demonstration of the Ken Burns effect in video form.

In film editing, the technique may be achieved through the use of a rostrum camera, although today it is more common to use digital editing. Virtually all non-linear editing systems provide a tool to implement the simplistic effect, although only some software, such as iMovie and Openshot for Linux, specifically call it a Ken Burns Effect; it is usually simply referred to as pan and zoom. Final Cut Pro, Apple TV and Apple's iMovie video editing program include a photo slideshow option also labelled "Ken Burns Effect".

On the Windows platform, AVS Video Editor, Windows Movie Maker, Pinnacle Studio, Serif MoviePlus, Avid Media Composer, Sony Vegas Studio (and Movie), Ulead VideoStudio, Adobe Premiere, and PTE AV Studio also have pan and zoom features built-in; otherwise, it is still available through third-party extensions.

Microsoft Photo Story creates videos with both random and customisable Ken Burns Effects automatically from selected images. ProShow Gold/Producer from Photodex and PhotoFilmStrip (free applications) also come with this effect.

On the Mac platform, programs such as Final Cut Pro, Final Cut Express, iMovie, Adobe Premiere also have the ability. Adobe and Apple products (excluding iMovie) allow the user to set keyframes to further customize the process.

The mobile video-editing app KineMaster (for Android and iPhone) has "Ken Burns/Crop and Pan" as the default setting for photo cropping.

The effect is found in various screensavers and slideshows, such as Apple. Windows PCs have the option of Greg Stitt's "MotionPicture" and Gregg Tavares's "Nostalgic", among others. The effect can also be seen in the N73 smartphone by Nokia, applied to the slideshows the phone creates from the pictures stored in it. Specific seventh-generation video game consoles also feature versions of this effect, including Nintendo's Wii Photo Channel, Sony's PlayStation 3 and within the Last.fm app for Xbox 360.

== Use by Apple ==
Full Ken Burns effect using Apple's iMovie for iOS.

Steve Jobs contacted Burns to obtain the filmmaker's permission to create the term "Ken Burns Effect" for Apple's iMovie video production software zoom and pan effect (the description had been Apple's internal working title while the feature was in development). Burns initially declined, saying that he did not allow his name to be used for commercial purposes, but finally he had Jobs give him some equipment (which he later donated for nonprofit use) in exchange for permission to use the term in Apple products.

In February 2014, Burns stated in his AMA ("Ask Me Anything", a question-and-answer interactive interview) on Reddit that Steve Jobs "asked my permission. I said yes. And six billion saved wedding, bar mitzvahs, vacation slideshows later, it's still going. But our attempt to 'wake the dead' relies on a much more nuanced and complicated relationship to the photograph (the DNA of storytelling), as well as the soundtrack."

Burns says that on occasion, strangers will stop him on the street to enthusiastically describe how they use the Ken Burns Effect on their Apple software or ask him questions. Burns, who writes his speeches longhand and calls himself a "Luddite", says he does not really understand what these Apple users are telling him and tries his best to make a quick escape.

== See also ==
- Motion control photography
- Multiplane camera
- Pan and scan
- Photoanimation
- Photo slideshow software
- Still image film
