= Slideware =

Slideware may refer to:

- A presentation program, such as Microsoft PowerPoint, LibreOffice Impress, or Apple Keynote
- Paper-copy materials distributed as part of a slideshow
- Vaporware, termed pejoratively when the product exists only in marketing promotions
