= Edit =

Edit may refer to:

== Concepts ==
- An action that is part of an editing process (including of images, video, and film)
- A particular version that is the result of editing, especially of film (for example, fan edit and fancam), or music (for example, radio edit)
- A film transition, also known as a "cut"
- A change to a computer file
- A change in the genome introduced via gene editing, or in the epigenome via epigenome editing
- "Edition (disambiguation)" (abbreviated "edit.")

== Music ==
- edIT, American electronic DJ and producer
- Edit (album), 2008, by Mark Stewart
- "Edit", a song by Regina Spektor from the 2006 album Begin to Hope

== Other uses ==
- Edit (given name), a list of people and fictional characters
- Equitas Development Initiatives Trust (EDIT), established by the Equitas Small Finance Bank in India
- Edit (application), a simple text editor for the Apple Macintosh
- Edit (MS-DOS), the MS-DOS Editor, a plain-text editor for MS-DOS, included in some versions of Microsoft Windows
- Edits (app), an American app
- The Edit (film), a 1985 short film
- The Edit, a fashion magazine published by Net-a-Porter

== See also ==
- Edith, a personal name
- Edict, a decree
