= Slide-tape =

Audiovisual work

A slide-tape work (often slide-tape presentation) is an audiovisual work consisting of a slide show using a filmstrip machine with synchronised accompanying audio, traditionally audio tape. These have frequently been used for education and for tourism, but also include artistic uses.

== History ==
The slide-tape presentation originated in and is particularly associated with the mid-to-late 20th century, when magnetic tape and slide projectors were common, but digital audio (such as compact discs) and digital video projectors were not. Even with the advent of video tapes in the 1970s and 1980s, producing videos was significantly more difficult than producing a slide show, and the image quality of videos was significantly lower than that of slides, resulting in slide-tape works continuing to be used into the 1980s and 1990s.

Analog slide-tape works have declined in use in the developed world, though digital ones continue to be produced, and can now be created with photo slideshow software. Analog use continues in countries in the less developed world.

== Examples ==
- James Coleman – artist
