= Song slide =

A song slide was a slide with the lyrics of a popular song projected in a movie house or vaudeville house. Typically, a live pianist would play the music, sometimes accompanied by a soloist, and the audience would join in the chorus. As a variation, a photograph of a model would appear along with the lyrics.

In movies during the silent film era. They served as additional entertainment, after the fashion of vaudeville before or between the films.
