= Kindvall =

Kindvall is a Swedish surname. Notable people with this surname include:

- Edit Kindvall (1866–1951), Swedish teacher, photographer, women's rights activist and suffragist
- Jan-Olov Kindvall (born 1960), Swedish footballer
- Niclas Kindvall (born 1967), Swedish footballer, son of Ove Kindvall
- Ove Kindvall (1943–2025), Swedish footballer
- Tina Kindvall, Swedish former footballer, daughter of Ove and sister of Niclas Kindvall
