= Boss School of Music =

Indian music institution

- Industry: Music
- Founded: 1996
- Headquarters: India
- Area served: Mumbai, Thane
- Services: Music education

The Boss School of Music was a Thane-based institution that conducted music classes in Mumbai, India. The school conducted electronic keyboard music workshops in collaboration with the University of Mumbai from 1996 to 2005, until it came under controversy for allegations of witchcraft and black magic, by parents of some students. Cases were filed in the Bombay High Court regarding the same, and were later dismissed by the Supreme Court of India.

== Music education ==
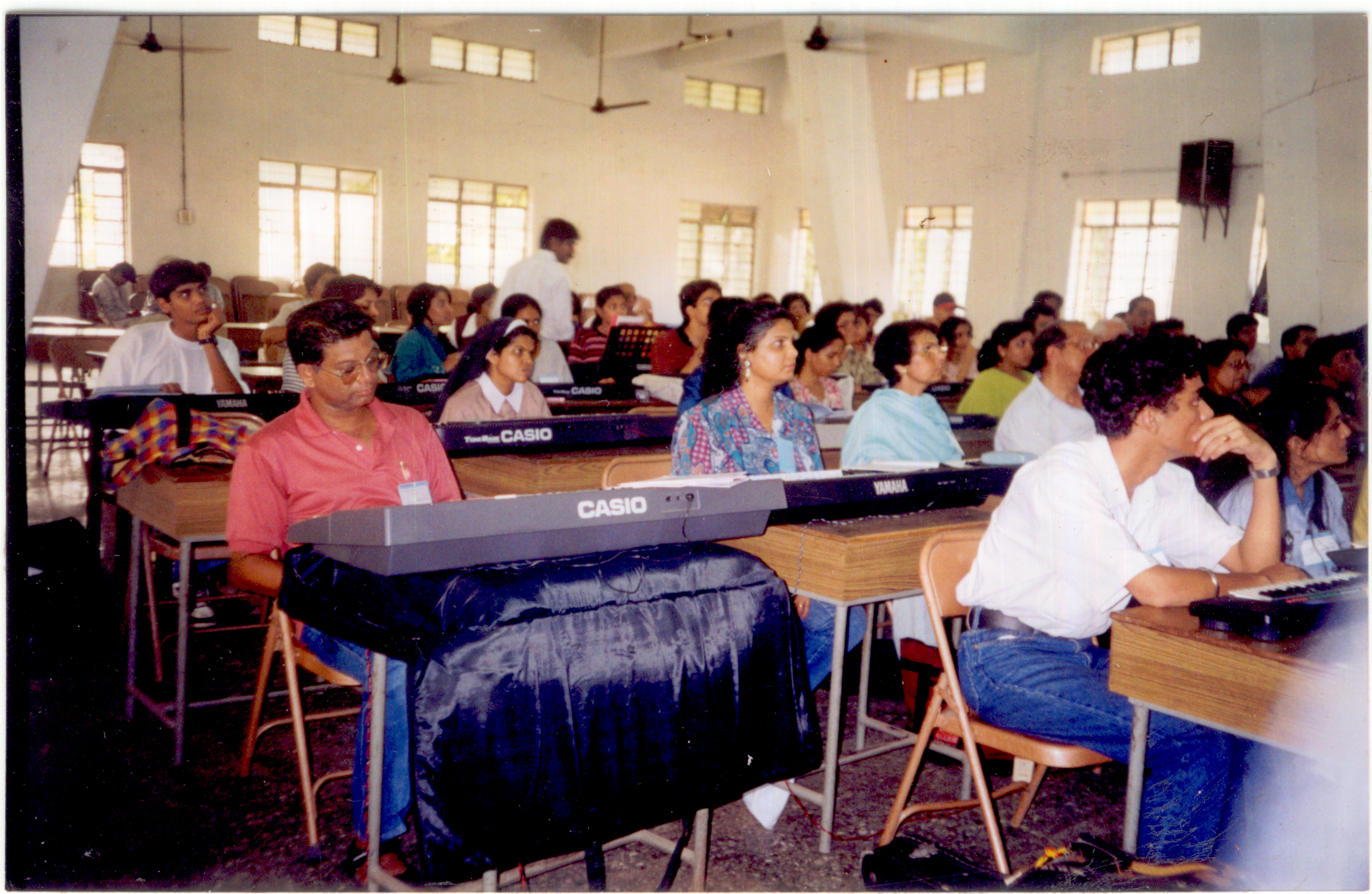
Students learn music in a course conducted by the Boss School in Mazagoan, Mumbai (1998)

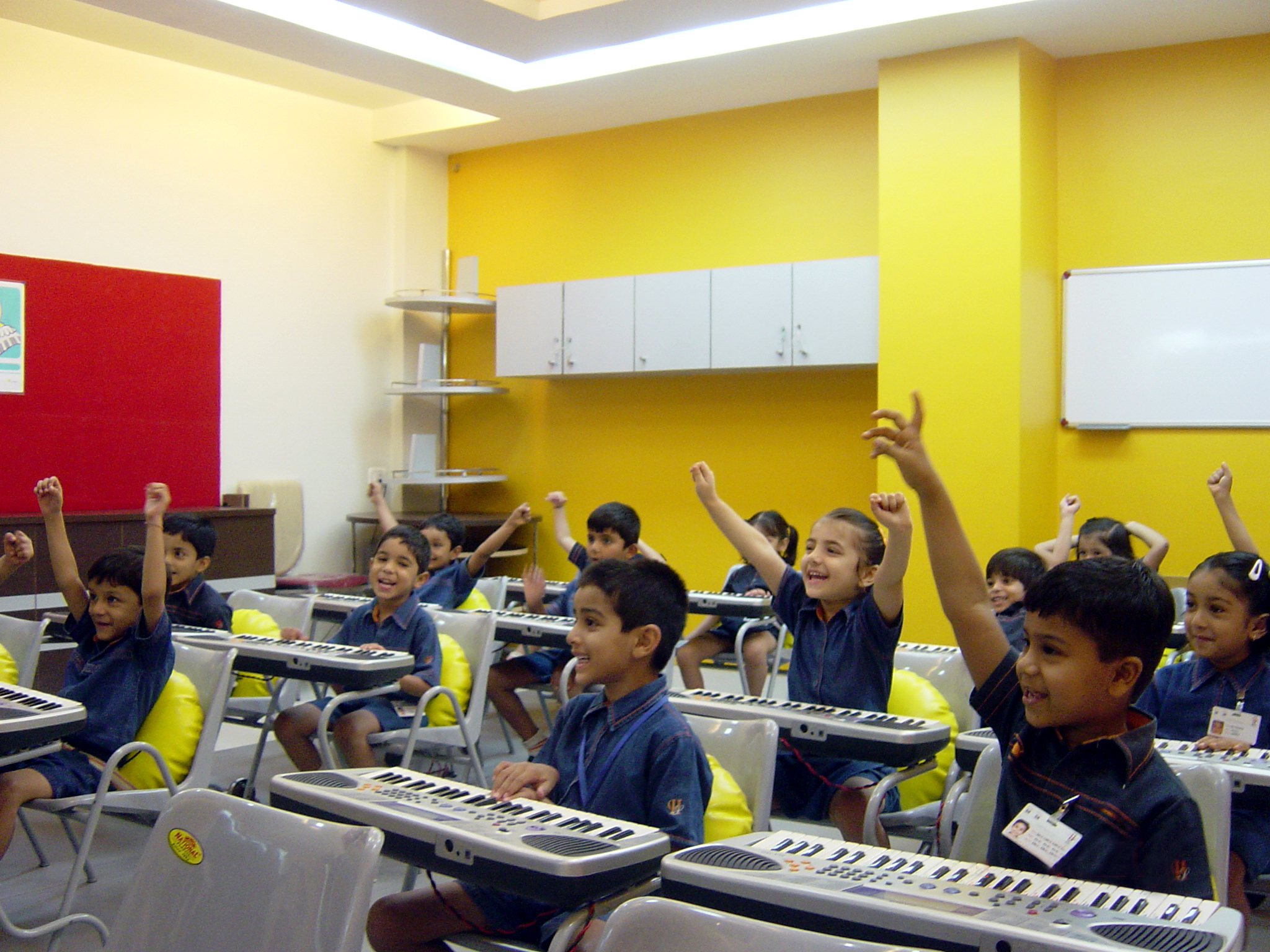
School children learn music under the Music in Schools programme, conducted by the Boss School in Tardeo, Mumbai (2005)

The Boss School of Music was founded as a nonprofit organisation in 1996. The school conducted short-term electronic keyboard music courses in suburban Mumbai for novices and professionals, after which students could reportedly perform certain pieces on the electronic keyboard, read music notation and write their own compositions.

During its tenure, musicians, educationists, doctors, artists and engineers joined the school as staff, working on a non-salaried basis to design better methods of music education. They ran centres in Bandra, Colaba, Dadar, Vile Parle and Churchgate. They prepared students for standardised graded examinations conducted by Trinity College London in Mumbai, requiring 3–6 months of training using their methods. Such examinations reportedly required up to 8 years of training using traditional methods.

Their education method utilised audio-visual technology and simplified concepts. Students were provided with keyboards during classes, and were given supplementary books and CDs printed and published by the school.

They entered into a collaboration with the Department of Music, University of Mumbai in 2002, and conducted classes that could reportedly train a novice student into becoming a music teacher in 6 months. Dr. Vidyadhar Vyas, Head of the Music Department at the university claimed that they "revolutionized" music learning by teaching complex musical concepts in short periods of time.

== Controversy ==
In 2005, parents of some students filed cases in the Bombay High Court accusing the school of practising witchcraft and black magic. Investigations by the Mumbai Police found no evidence for such claims, and a local representative of Trinity College London confirmed that the examination certificates received by the students were authentic. The police halted investigation awaiting evidence and witnesses for the allegations. Due to attacks by local mobs and fearing their safety, the school staff and researchers subsequently left their Thane premises.

In 2008, several staff members of the school proceeded to the Supreme Court of India with cases against individuals, government officials and High Court judges for shutting down the institution, defamation and "witch-hunting", an act they termed "genocide". The Supreme Court dismissed their cases, reportedly because it contained allegations against high-ranking officials, judges and police. The Supreme Court also arrested 4 of the staff members on grounds of contempt, after a staff member hurled a slipper at a Supreme Court judge. The High Court cases regarding the allegations were dismissed by the Supreme Court.

Another three staff members filed cases in the Federal Court of Australia, accusing the Sydney-based Exclusive Brethren sect for committing a "genocide" by destroying their group, and bribing Indian officials and judges to do so. Reportedly, they did not have the funding for proper legal representation, and appeared in court without lawyers. The Federal Court questioned its ability to order the Australian Federal Police to investigate the matter, and the case was adjourned.

While defending High Court cases that claimed she was "mentally unsound", one of the staff members received two gold medals from the Mumbai University for topping the board that year.

== See also ==
- Performing arts
- Music education
- Trinity College London
- University of Mumbai
- Supreme Court of India
- Bombay High Court
- Exclusive Brethren
