= IBM Storyboard Plus =

Discontinued graphic software suite

IBM Storyboard
- Developer: IBM
- Initial release: 1985; 41 years ago
- Type: Presentation program

IBM Storyboard was a presentation program introduced by IBM in 1985 for DOS as the PC Storyboard, followed later by IBM Storyboard Plus and IBM Storyboard Live!. Storyboard was a package of several modules combining graphics, text, and later video, sound and music.

== History ==
PC Storyboard was introduced by IBM in February 1985. Originally conceived by Bradley J. Beitel of the IBM Information Services business unit as a slide show presentation software enabling use of different lettering styles. Improved versions were released in the late 1980s (IBM Storyboard Plus) and early 1990s (IBM Storyboard Live! 1.0).

== Features ==
PC Storyboard consisted of four modules: Picture Maker, a graphic editor; Picture Taker, a screenshot capture program; Story Editor, a script assembly tool; and Story Teller, a run-time presentation module. Picture Maker was similar to a paint program but did not support a computer mouse. It allowed included clip art and could create bar graphs, pie charts, and line graphs. Picture Taker could capture graphs from other applications and supported automatic shading of text graphics. The program had no on-screen menu and was controlled only by keyboard commands, with no support for a mouse or tablet. Its capture capability was limited to CGA resolution. Story Editor included transition effects such as fades and replacements, support for partial image replacement, and flow control commands. It also allowed branching to another script. Story Teller could launch other applications during a presentation, although the IBM logo and copyright notice at startup could not be removed. The package included documentation of more than 150 pages.

IBM Storyboard Plus expanded the package into five modules, including Text Maker for creating screens in text mode, and widened support for voice, sound, and music on IBM PS/2 computers. The application could use up to 640×480 screen resolution in 256 colors, but only on IBM 8514/A compatible cards; extended modes on VGA cards were not supported. Included modules added new features: Picture Maker supported irregularly shaped objects, resizing selections, and on-screen rulers. Story Editor offered expanded transition effects and use of animated objects, and also allowed branching, including to another story file, and could run MS-DOS applications. The freely distributed Story Teller used mixed display resolutions for respective frames in the presentation. The package supported TIFF and PCX image file formats.

The IBM Storyboard Live! package offered five main modules: Electronic Presentation, Picture Maker, Picture Taker, Story Editor, and Story Teller. It also integrated utilities such as Sprite Editor and Video Editor. Picture Maker offered up to 800 clip art images. Picture Taker could capture OS/2 and Windows 3.0 screens, as well as DOS screens. It also could display video from another external device at low resolutions. The Sprite Editor utility allowed users to create animation sequences of up to 63 frames per sprite at 30 frames per second. The Video Editor utility, formerly an add-on from Krepec Publishing, gave users the ability to record a sprite from an external video source. The Story Editor had an improved user interface, and its commands could be accessed from a pull-down menu. The new version also expanded support for file formats, allowing import of ASCII, PIC, IBM Audio Visual Connection (AVC), GIF, IBM Linkway, BMP, PCX, and TIFF, with a maximum screen resolution of 640x480 in 256 colors. The package also used MIDI and digitized sound.

== Reception ==
PC Storyboard was initially well received. PC Magazine review from October 1985 commended it as an "exciting package", with only big deficiency being no support for mouse or drawing tablet. Later comparisons with other similar products on the market were less flattering. In December 1986, PC Magazine noted that keyboard commands aren't intuitive. Next year, InfoWorld regarded it as a pioneer product, which shows its age as a graphics editor. Commended were special effects and good documentation. However, the magazine criticized lack of free hand drawing, limitation to CGA screen resolutions and user interface in the reviewed version 1.12.

Reviewing IBM Storyboard Plus 2.0 in 1989, InfoWorld again praised good documentation and combination of graphics with sound at a competitive price highlighting that Storyboard "is the only DOS screen-show presentation program that allows for 256-color display at 640 by 480 and a synchronized voice/music soundrack", but disliked its unintuitive user interface combining keyboard and mouse: "Using Storyboard with a mouse is a little like doing tango with your feet in a gunny sack."

In February 1991, InfoWorld compared IBM Storyboard Live! 1.0 to Microsoft PowerPoint and Macromind Director for Mac. In comparison to Microsoft Powerpoint, Storyboard lacks vector drawing of text and graphics, but offers animation, scripting language and support for audio and video. Macromind Director has all these features, but is also more expensive. Review noted that extensive documentation doesn't include features introduced in this new version.
