= Dennis Fregger =

Dennis Fregger (born August 13, 1942, Idaho Falls, Idaho) was on the team (also including Joan Shogren and Mike Mathis) that produced the "serious" clip art images. These black and white, bitmapped images were the first ones designed for business/organizational use and were published by T/Maker as "ClickArt Publications" in 1984.

Fregger also produced the Macintosh graphics for Solitaire Royale, published by Spectrum Holobyte in 1987.

Fregger lives in Aptos, California and is retired from the Santa Clara, California Fire Department.
