= Storyboard (disambiguation) =

A storyboard is a layout for planning video action.

Storyboard or Storyboards may also refer to:

- Storyboard (TV series), a television show (1961)
- Storyboards (album), a musical recording
- IBM Storyboard Plus, a graphic software suite
- Storyboard (Apple programming), a file format used in software development for iOS and macOS computers
