= Bruno (software) =

WYSIWYG presentation program (1979-)

BRUNO was the first commercial computer software program for creating presentations using a WYSIWYG user interface. BRUNO, which originated on the Hewlett Packard HP 1000 F-Series computer, was developed by Jim Long and Philip Walden of Hewlett Packard. The application was finished in 1979 and was used around the world by HP customers. BRUNO was later ported to the HP 3000 series and renamed HPDRAW. HPDRAW was released sometime before November 1982, when it was sold as part of the software page "HP Words, Data, and Graphics".

== Trivia ==
- Bruno was named after a hand puppet used to train field sales representatives.
- Bruno became HP-Draw mostly because Robert Dea, a HP-3000 team member, and Philip Walden shared work topics during their long van pool rides.
