= Volk Clip Art =

Advertising art studio

- Logo introduced in 1975
- Formerly: Harry Volk Jr. Advertising (1948–1952); Harry Volk Jr. Art Studio (1952–1971); Volk Corporation (1971–1979); Volk Clip Art (1979–1996)
- Industry: Advertising, illustrations
- Founded: 1948; 77 years ago in Atlantic City, New Jersey, United States
- Founder: Harry Volk Jr.
- Defunct: 1996
- Key people: Harry Volk Jr., Thomas B. Sawyer
- Products: Illustration booklets
- Owner: Harry Volk Jr.

Volk Clip Art, Inc., better known as the Harry Volk Jr. Art Studio, was an advertising art studio specializing in artwork meant to be sold for commercial use in print. Using a subscription based service, designers and journalists had the option to be sent monthly booklets of free-to-use artwork to use within their own publications. With the purchase of the service (or any specific booklet) came the permission to use the artwork included for any purpose, personal or commercial. This opened the doorway for many smaller news outlets, designers, and businesses to add artwork to their print without having to hire their own illustrators. Volk booklets were available both by mail and in print shops.

== History ==
Henry "Harry" Camblos Volk Jr. was born January 16, 1910, in Philadelphia, Pennsylvania. Being the son of a man in news advertising, Harry began his career as a journalist for the Atlantic City Press as well as the Miami Herald, Harrisburg Patriot News, Ventnor Town Crier, and The Boardwalker. In 1948, Volk would have his own advertising agency, Harry Volk Jr. Advertising. With this, he would start selling "clip books," books of logos and artwork (known as "printer cuts" or "stock cuts") that can be used in periodicals and newspapers for a small fee beginning with the National Brands Clip Book that same year. This would prove to be successful, and Volk would also sell clip books of other subjects such as trademarks and Christmas imagery.

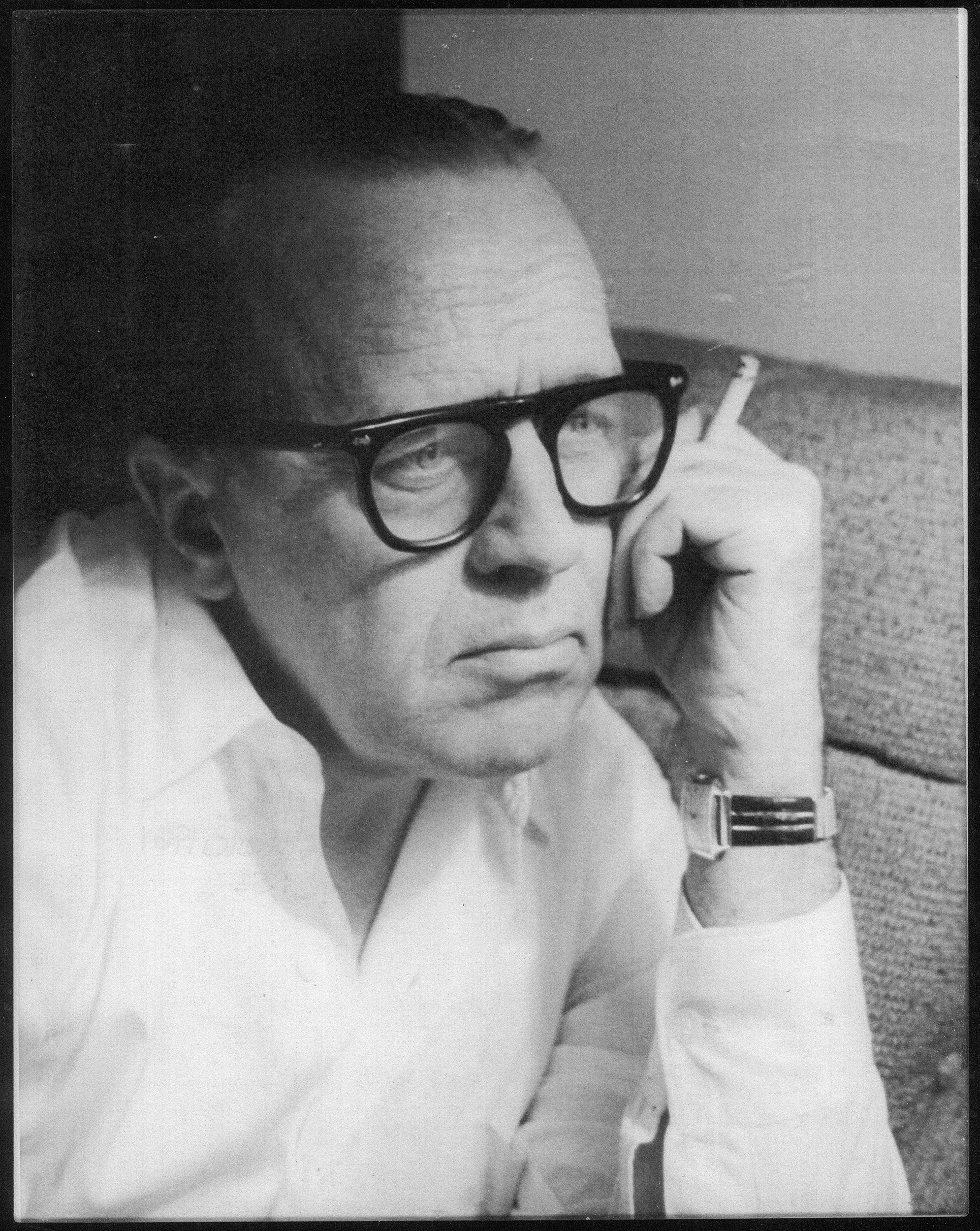
Self Portrait by Harry Volk Jr.

In 1952, Volk would rebrand to the Harry Volk Jr. Art Studio and begin to produce a consistent series of clip books illustrating various objects and people to be used for the same purpose. These clip books would be sold for 2.50 each or sent to a subscriber as a set every month for a monthly five-dollar fee. Volk would hire various illustrators, often comic artists to contribute to the clip books, giving a substantial amount of creative freedom. These illustrators identities would remain anonymous due to the nature of stock art as well as being relatively unknown and uncredited artists in their profession. However, the identity of one of Volk's most used illustrators would surface later as Thomas B. Sawyer, a comic illustrator, screenwriter, and director during his interviews with author Leif Peng. Though it is unknown when exactly Sawyer's work began and ended in Volk's books, his iconic, expressive style can often be identified on the cover and interiors of most of the booklets. The illustrators often would never meet face to face or even meet Volk in person; rather, they would communicate almost exclusively by phone, creating a "country of artists." Volk also employed his own daughter, Jeannemarie Volk, when she was in times of need.

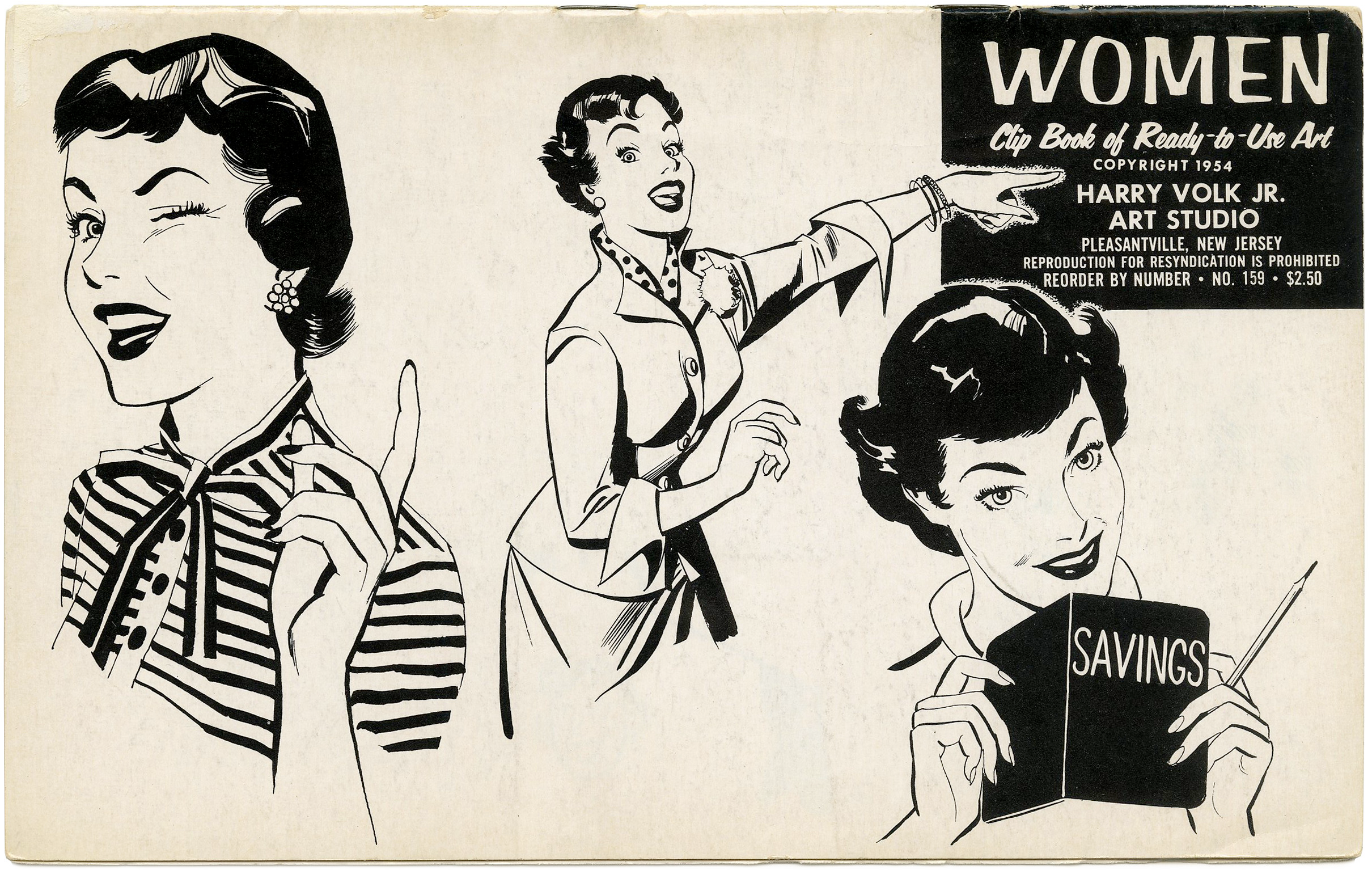
Cover for Women: Clip Book of Ready-to-Use Art from the Harry Volk Jr. Art Studio

The illustrations within Volk's booklets would be widely used throughout the middle of the 20th century in anything between flyers to magazines. In 1971, the studio name would be dropped for the Volk Corporation, and in 1974 it would introduce its own logo designed by Herb Lubalin. Subjects for each the booklet would become more abstract, sometimes simply being "Danger" or "Worry-Fear." Certain proprietary styles and series would also be introduced such as "Zanies"; books which have silly characters in them, or "Grafika" which were books that had more contemporary, flat illustrations. By 1979, the company name was changed yet again to simply "Volk Clip Art." In 1984, Volk introduced "Grafikline," a proprietary photo processing service to convert photographs into printable cuts without a mezzotint or halftone process. Photograph negatives would be exposed onto scratch paper, then the picture would be traced and stippled accordingly to be converted by hand into print-ready line art.

On March 30 of 1990, Harry Volk Jr. died at home from lung cancer. Volk Clip Art would continue to produce clip booklets until they were acquired by Dynamic Graphics, a competing clip art agency, in 1993. Dynamic Graphics would continue to produce and distribute Volk clip booklets under the name Volk Artfile, as well as briefly produce a series of CD-ROMs containing clipart named Electronic Volk starting in 1995. In 1996, the trademark of Volk would be canceled, officially marking the end of Volk Clip Art. The artwork included within these booklets would continue to be recycled and reused time and time again, included in later compilations of clip books by different companies (though that directly went against the terms and conditions within Volk's books.)

== See also ==
- Clip art
