= Solitaire Royale =

Digital solitaire games

- Developer: Software Resources International
- Publisher: Spectrum HoloByte
- Designer: Brad Fregger
- Programmers: Michael Sandige (PC); Brodie Lockard (Mac)
- Artist: Dennis Fregger (Mac)
- Platforms: Amiga, Apple IIGS, MS-DOS, FM-7, Macintosh, MSX2, NEC PC-8801, NEC PC-9801, Sharp X1
- Release: 1987
- Genre: Strategy
- Mode: Single-player

Solitaire Royale is a collection of solitaire games published by Spectrum HoloByte in 1987 for the Apple IIGS, MS-DOS, Macintosh, and Amiga. The eight games included are "3 Shuffles and a Draw", "Pyramid", "Golf", "Corners", "Reno", "Klondike", "Canfield", and "Calculation". There are also three children's games: "Pairs", "The Wish", and "Concentration".

== Gameplay ==
Solitaire Royale is a computer solitaire card-game simulation which features colorful card-back designs, digitized sounds of cards shuffling, and eight solitaire games. The game features a tournament competition where the challenge is to accumulate the highest total score upon playing all eight games in a row, with the two combatants receiving exactly the same deal. When a solitaire game is won, fireworks are displayed.

== Reception ==
The game received 5 out of 5 stars in Dragon #141 in "The Role of Computers" column.
