= PhotoStage =

Video slideshow creation software

PhotoStage Slideshow Producer
- Developer: NCH Software
- Initial release: May 20, 2008; 17 years ago
- Stable release: 10.14
- Operating system: Windows, macOS, Android, iOS
- Available in: English, German, French, Italian, Spanish, Japanese, Chinese, Korean, Swedish, Dutch, Portuguese, Russian
- License: Freeware
- Website: www.nchsoftware.com/slideshow/index.html

PhotoStage Slideshow Producer is a video slideshow creator using photos, videos, and music. It can also be used as an organizational and basic editing tool.

== Software ==
A slideshow can be made by importing the desired photos. The software includes a timeline thumbnail with duration and transition types for each photo. Text tool can be used to add one or two lines of text to the slides.

Whilst using the software, one can add their own recorded narration or soundtrack by accessing the NCH Sound Effect Library. The slideshow file is exportable in fifteen formats.

== Reception ==
The software has been reviewed by Top Ten Reviews, Softonic, and others.
