= Edits (app) =

Free video editor owned by Meta Platforms

Edit
- The official logo of the Edits app, as of May 2025
- Developer: Meta Platforms
- Release: April 21, 2025 (17 months ago)
- Operating system: iOS; Android
- Available in: 32+ (iOS) languages
- License: Proprietary
- Website: creators.instagram.com/edits

Edits is an American photo and short form video editing software service owned by Meta Platforms. It allows users to create videos and edit them by using features like green screens, and AI animation, and also provides real-time statistics to Instagram creators to track their accounts. Accounts directly from Instagram can be imported, and videos can be exported vice-versa. It is available solely on iOS and Android. On Apple, it supports over 32 different languages, including French, Spanish, and Chinese. It has been noted by critics as a direct competitor for apps like CapCut, owned by Chinese brand ByteDance. The Instagram head, Adam Mosseri, also acknowledged these similarities.

Launched on April 22 for both iOS and Android. It received over 5M+ users on Apple and Android combined in its first 4 days since its launch.

== History ==
On January 19, 2025, following the ban of all ByteDance Apps from the Google Play Store, and App Store, Instagram head Adam Mosseri announced on Threads that they would be launching the app in February for iOS, followed by an Android counterpart. He said the app is working with select people to test its features. In a separate post, he emphasized that the app is "more for creators than casual video makers".

== Features ==
Edits contains many similar features to other competition of video editors like KineMaster, Inshot, and CapCut. When creating a video, users have the option to export in resolution of HD, 4K, and 2K, along with having HDR and SDR support. Like many traditional video editing software, it includes a timeline, and basic undo-redo buttons. On the bottom bar, 7 tabs for editing exist, namely the Split, Volume, Adjust, Speed, Delete, Filters, Green Screen, Voice FX, Extract Audio, Mirror, Slip, Replace and Duplicate bars. Basic features, like splitting, and adjusting speed and volume of clips are present, along with more advanced Green Screens, and AI features. Being a mobile video editor app, Edits also has drag-and-drop features to ease customer usage.

Users have the ability to record videos directly within the app. This feature allows users to create content without needing extra software or devices. They can choose from several focal lengths, which affect how close or wide the shot appears. The app also supports different frame rates. Users have the ability to record videos directly within the app. This feature allows users to create content without needing extra software or devices. Once users are done filming your clips, they can simply transfer them into a project to start editing immediately. Upcoming features for the app include Keyframes, AI-powered modification, Collaboration, and Enhanced creativity.

== Reception ==
Since its release, it received over 5 million downloads in 4 days. Critically, the app received great rankings from many. From users, the app received an average of 4.45 stars over Google Play Store and App Store in the first few days, with Google Play Store receiving the least stars. As in reviews, it was received mixed by the public. Many people praised the smoothness and intuitiveness of the app. "The app is more than just a basic editor, offering a full suite of creative tools, including a dedicated tab for inspiration and trending audio, as well as a tab for managing drafts," said a blogger. Some users were disappointed with the range of editing tools. Some have noted that it could benefit from more transition options between clips. Some even reported crashing between clips.

== See also ==
- Instagrams' Edits on Google Play
- Instagrams' Edits on Apple App Store
- Instagrams' Edits' Website
- Instagram
