= Joan Shogren =

American chemist and early computer artist (1932–2020)

Joan Shogren (July 5, 1932 – June 15, 2020) was an American chemist and early computer artist, displaying her first work, made with punched cards, in 1963. She was born in Mount Vernon, Washington on July 5, 1932, and died on June 15, 2020, at the age of 87.
