= James Coleman (Irish artist) =

Irish artist

James Coleman (born 1941) is an Irish installation and video artist associated with slide-tape works: sequences of still images fading one into the other with synchronized sound. Often, social situations are depicted with a precision which, paradoxically, creates a narrative ambiguity. There is often a focus in his works on how time can warp subjective experience, and how this subjectivity is indispensable to an understanding of how the photographic image accrues meaning.

James Coleman was born in Ballaghaderreen, County Roscommon. He studied at the National College of Art and Design, Dublin, and at University College, Dublin and then spent time in Paris and London before moving to Milan, where he stayed for twenty years. He now lives and works in Ireland. He represented Ireland in the 1973 Paris Biennale. His many exhibitions include a large retrospective shown in a number of major galleries throughout Dublin in 2009, and retrospectives at Reina Sofia, Madrid (2012), and at Centre Pompidou, Paris (2021).

He was conferred with the degree of Doctor of Fine Arts honoris causa by the National University of Ireland at NUI Galway in June 2006.

== Work in collections ==
- S.M.A.K. – Stedelijk Museum voor Actuele Kunst, Gent
- Fondation Cartier pour l'art contemporain, Paris
- Musée National d'Art Moderne, Paris
- Museum Ludwig, Cologne
- Irish Museum of Modern Art, Dublin
- Museu d'Art Contemporani de Barcelona, Barcelona
- Kunstmuseum Luzern, Luzern
