= Edit Machlik =

Norwegian footballer and chess player (born 1997)

- Born: October 9, 1997 (age 29); Tromsø, Norway
- Chess career
- Country: Norway
- Peak rating: 2127 (March 2015)
Association football career
- Height: 1.71 m (5 ft 7 in)
- Position: Defender
Team information
- Current team: Tromsø IL women
- Number: 17
Senior career*
Years	Team	Apps	(Gls)
2013–2020	Tromsø IL		
2021	IF Fløya	15	(0)
2022–	Tromsø IL women	40	(3)
- * Club domestic league appearances and goals

Edit Lund Machlik is a Norwegian footballer and chess player.

== Career ==
=== Football ===
She began playing with the Tromsø IL club at the age of 7. In 2025, she signed with the Tromsø IL women’s team as defender. In her aggregate football career, she has played 265 matches and scored 44 goals. For the 2021 season, she moved to IF Fløya; the club became part of the new TIL 2020 club in the following year.

=== Chess ===
In November 2021, she played for Norway in the European Team Chess Championship. She scored 4/8 and notably defeated 2253-rated Jovana Erić and drew against 2269-rated Jana Schneider.

In August 2022, she played on board 2 for Norway in the 44th Chess Olympiad. She scored 6.5/10 overall, drawing against 2321-rated Zala Urh and defeating 2171-rated Bayarjargal Bayarmaa.

== Personal life ==
Outside of football and chess, she is also a freelance double bassist and a practicing dentist. Her twin sister is sports commentator and fellow chess player Monika Machlik.
