= VCN ExecuVision =

Graphics and presentation program

Special Issue of IEEE, illustrating the power of VCN ExecuVision. This special issue was edited by the creator of this software.

VCN ExecuVision, a combination graphics program and file manager, was the first presentation program for the personal computer, created by Visual Communications Network, Inc. and published by Prentice-Hall, Inc. for the IBM PC in 1984. The program's pre-loaded graphics library and its separate additions make the VCN ExecuVision the first professional digital clip art library. Featuring ten different typefaces, 64 color schemes, clip art, animation options, the ability to import images and the ability to draw freehand using a mouse, this program allowed users to manipulate graphics and text built with business data presentation in mind but could be used for all visual communication purposes. The program's capabilities were expanded with the release of six supplemental graphics libraries sold as individual floppy disks, which were to be joined by four more said to be in production but were ultimately never released. All of these functions required PC DOS 1.01, 128KB RAM, two disk drives, a color monitor and color graphics adapter to operate, as well as either an IBM dot-matrix or Hewlett-Packard printer to print visuals created within the program.

VCN ExecuVision gained popularity quickly following its release as it enabled businesses to create presentation slides and data visualizations quickly and easily, and was relatively cheaper than having to rely on an art department to produce all professional visual media. The benefits of this software program were first discussed in the journal of Institute of Electrical and Electronics Engineers in March 1984. In addition to the benefits of VCN ExecuVision, the journal published images created by the software, illustrating the new emerging software available for personal computers at that time.
