= Edit Terästö =

Finnish politician (1913–2004)

Edit Viktoria Terästö (25 February 1913 – 1 April 2004; née Raudanpää) was a Finnish politician, born in Lempäälä.

== Career ==
She was a member of the Parliament of Finland from 1962 to 1972, representing the Social Democratic Party of Finland (SDP). She was a presidential elector in the 1962, 1968, 1978 and 1982 presidential elections.
