= Wireless clicker =

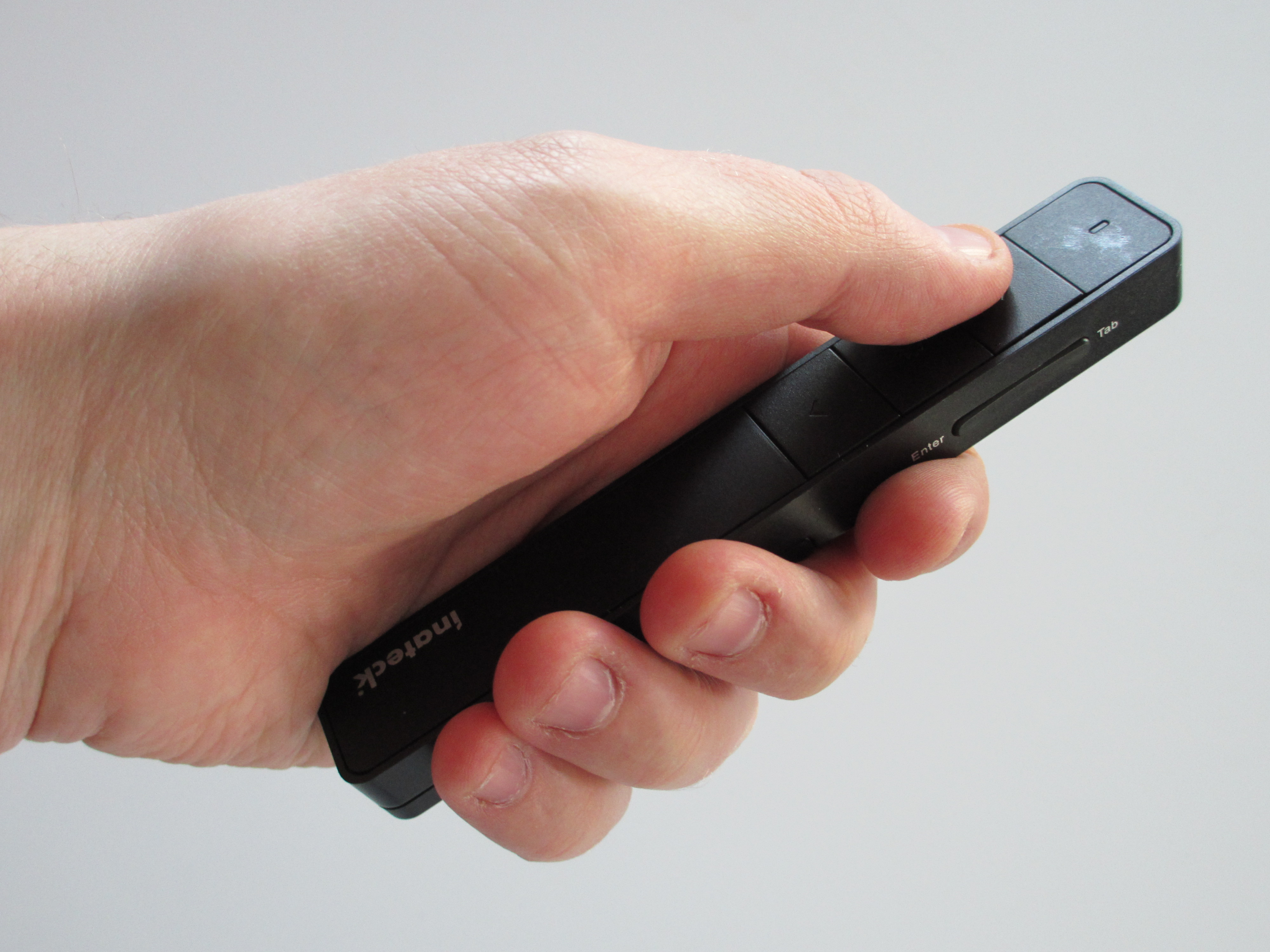
Inateck WP1002 RF mouse pointer

A wireless clicker or wireless presenter is a handset remote used to control a computer during a presentation, by emulating a "mouse click" + "some keys of a PC keyboard"; usually incorporating a laser pointer to pinpoint screen details. It is mainly used for presentations with a video projector or a big TV screen (for example a computer presentation created with PowerPoint, Impress or VCN ExecuVision), allowing the presenter to move freely in front of the audience.

== PC interface ==
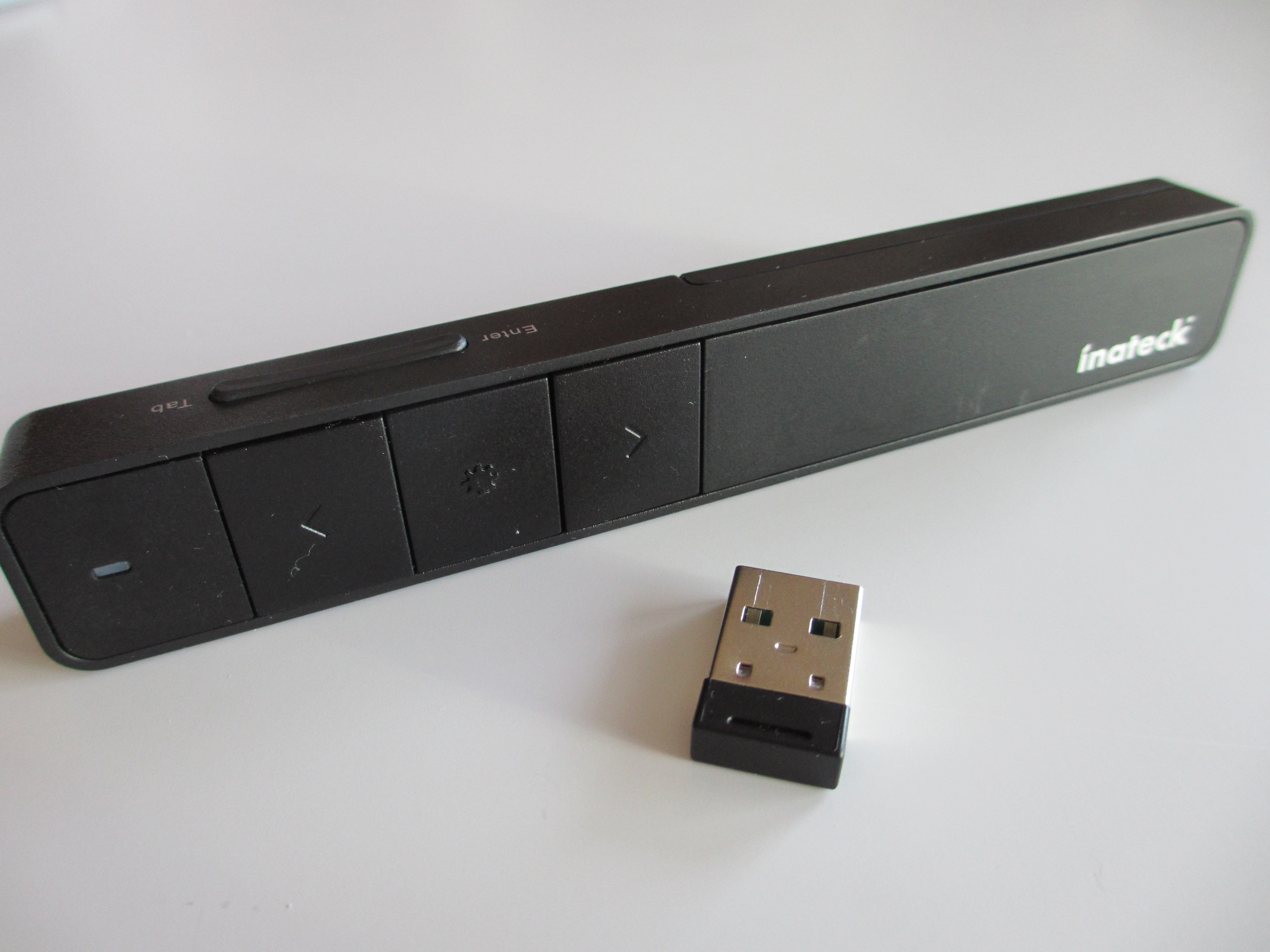
RF mouse pointer (remote control and USB interface)

The clicker consists of a transmitter similar to a remote control and a small receiver, usually in the form of a USB dongle connected to a USB port on the computer, that detects it as if it were a mouse. Control signals are transmitted by radio (for example 2.4 GHz, Bluetooth ) or in some models by infrared. Usually no additional programs are needed on the computer. Typically it uses no special communication protocol in the presentation program, but instead emulates simple keyboard inputs ( arrow keys, F5 function key, etc..) and some other type of mouse interface (buttons, scroll wheel displacement, etc..).

The range of devices operated by radio is usually specified between 10 and 15 meters; at the coverage limit, the orientation of the pointer and its internal antenna may be critical. An infrared connection can only be used with a clear line of sight to the PC. The dongle is powered by the USB port and the remote control is usually powered by small batteries such as: button batteries, AA batteries or AAA batteries, although some models are rechargeable.

== Included elements ==
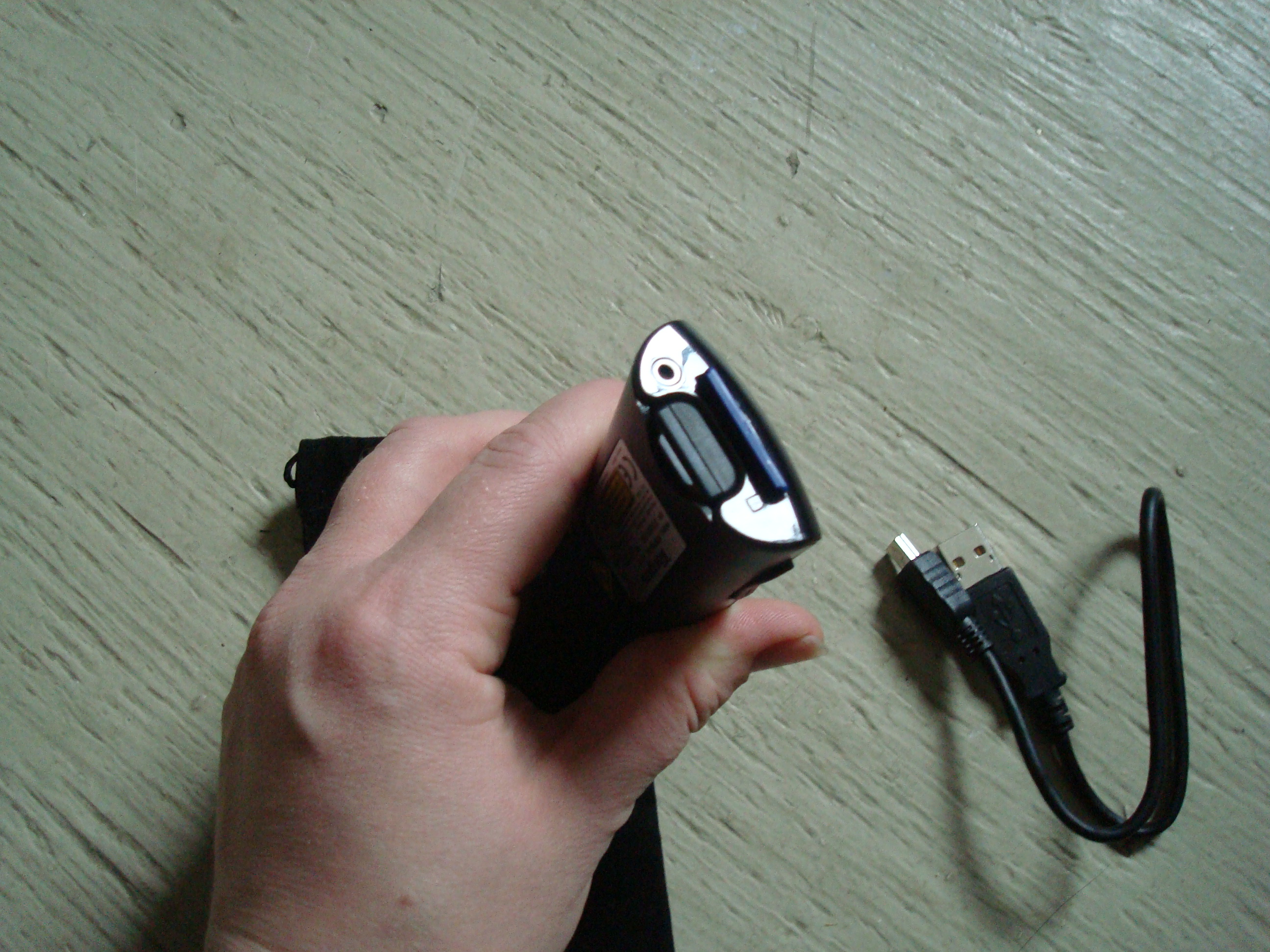
Targus presenter + SD card

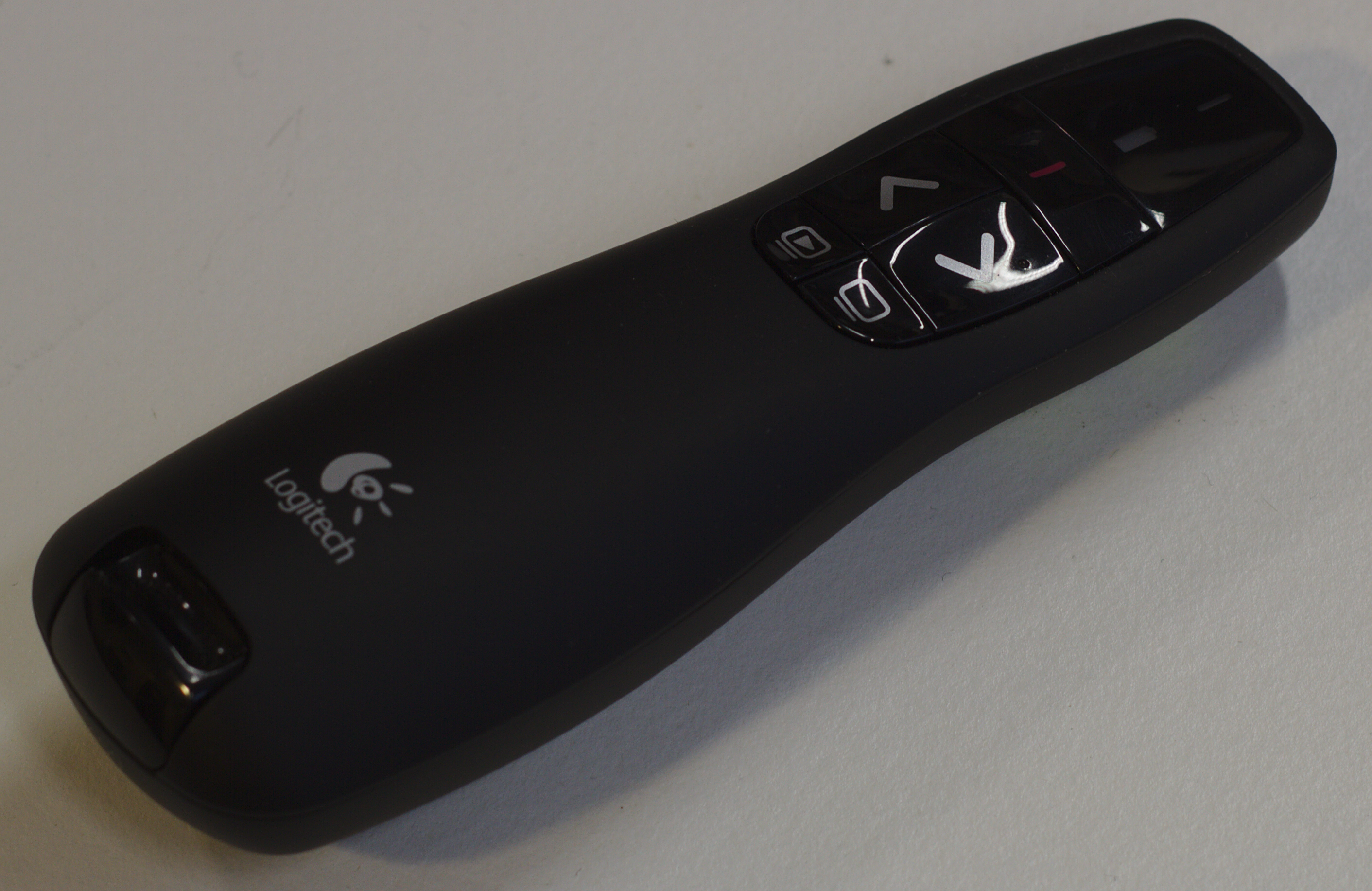
Logitech presenter + laser pointer

=== Pen-drive and timer ===
Additional features may include a built-in flash memory in the receiver dongle, so there is no need for an additional flash drive to carry the presentation files. Some models include a timer with a built-in vibration alarm, to notify the speaker when time is up

Some clickers completely emulate a mouse, being able to move the mouse cursor around the screen and thus control programs (e.g. Logitech). Inversely, some wireless mice are also equipped with some specific characteristics.

=== Laser pointer ===
Apart from the elements to control the presentation, the wireless presenters often contain a laser pointer. A distinctive feature among the models offered in the market, is the color of the laser. For presentations, green is more visible than red.

== Benefits ==
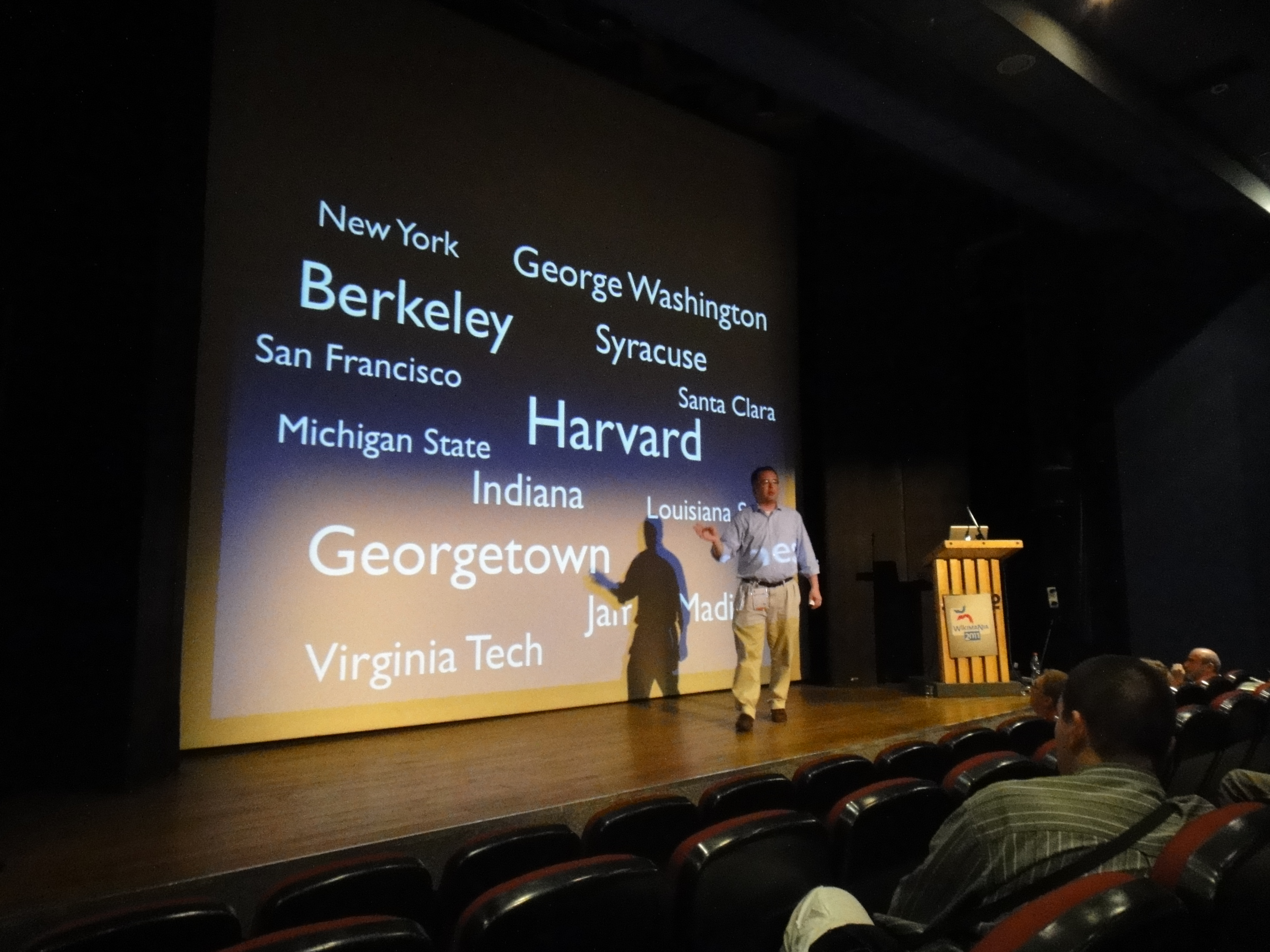
A speaker giving a presentation with an RF pointer in his left hand

Using a wireless clicker, helps the presenter to move freely, instead of being obliged to stay next to the computer, can get closer and keep in touch with the audience, watching the presentation together with them, being able to use the built-in laser pointer, in order to emphasize specific points in the dialogue with the participants. This makes interactive learning possible and minimizes some negative characteristics of face-to-face teaching. In fact, it works especially well when the presentation slides consist only of images used to provide an emotional background, by illustrating the actual presentation.

Another beneficial effect of the clicker remote is that it is "hand-squeezable" as an anti-stress object. The possibility of being able to use the handset, in a stressful situation, may act as an anti-stress ball, calming some people who otherwise tend to feel nervous or stressed during presentations, when speaking in front of a large audience. One can remember the case of The Caine Mutiny, when Captain Queeg is questioned, he tries to calm down by moving in his hand, a pair of steel Baoding balls.

== Bibliography ==
- Ntalianis, K.; Andreatos, A.; Sgouropoulou, C. (2018). ECEL 2018 17th European Conference on e-Learning. Academic Conferences and Publishing Limited. ISBN 978-1-912764-08-2.
