= Edit Gláz =

Hungarian endocrinologist

Edit Gláz was a Hungarian endocrinologist and a Professor of Endocrinology. She was born in Budapest on September 8, 1926. Her work included research on salivary cortisol as well as germline VHL mutations in Hungarian families with von Hippel-Lindau disease. She was awarded the Silver degree of the Order of Merit in 1986 and the Semmelweis Medal in 1995. She died on December 20, 2020
