= Edit Kindvall =

Swedish teacher, photographer and suffragist (1866–1951)

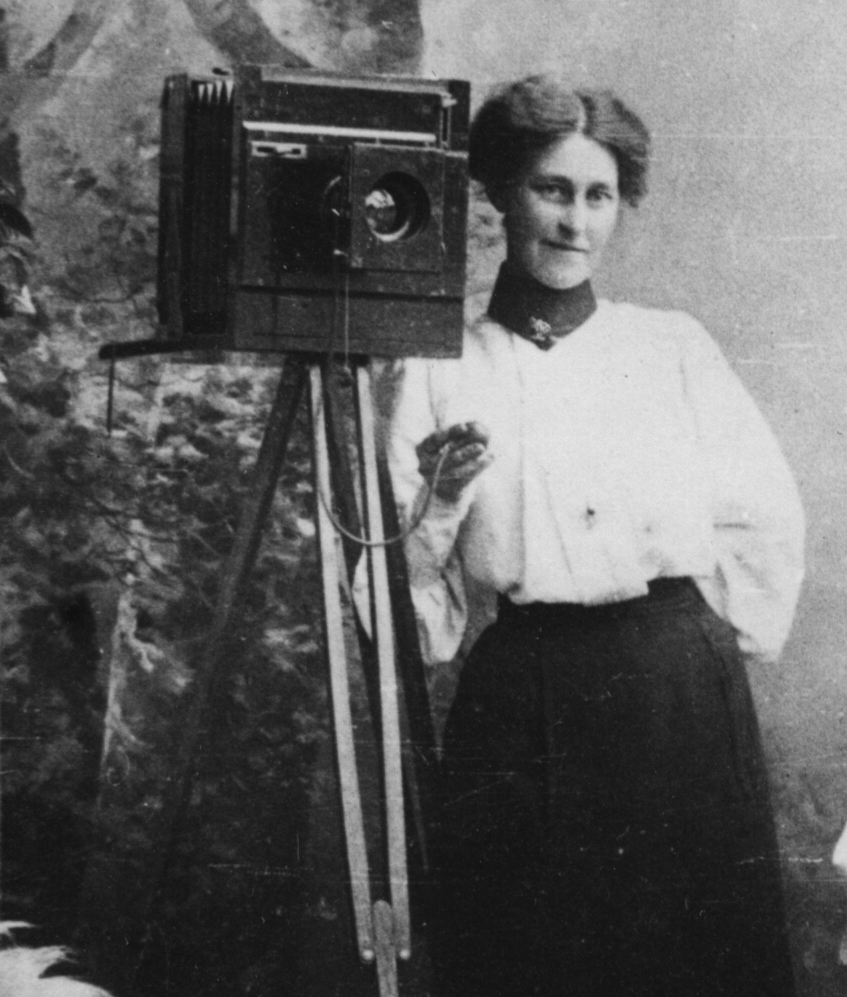
- Born: 21 July 1866
- Died: 26 December 1951 (aged 85)
- Occupations: photographer, teacher and activist
- Organization: National Association for Women's Suffrage
- Political party: Moderate Party

Edit Maria Kindvall (21 July 1866 – 26 December 1951) was a Swedish teacher, photographer, women's rights activist and suffragist. After teaching in various locations from 1886, in 1901 she trained as a photographer, opening her own studio in Storvik in 1902. In 1907, she founded the local Storvik branch of the National Association for Women's Suffrage (LPKR), later becoming a member of the association's central board. Kindvall was also politically active in the Swedish People's Association and in the Moderate Party.

== Biography ==
Born in Varberg on 21 July 1866, Edit Maria Kindvall was the third in a family of five children. After the father's death, in 1881 the mother moved with the children from Tranås to Linköping but Kindball returned to Tranås where she probably trained as a teacher.

In 1886, Kindvall moved to Finspång working as a teacher until 1889. After a further year in Tranås, she moved to Gothenburg, from 1895 to 1897 she taught in Stråtjära, Hälsingland after which she became a governess in Sundsvall until 1901.

She then decided to change her profession to that of a photographer, working with Carl Berggren in Arbrå as an assistant in 1901. The following year, she opened her own studio in Storvik which she managed until around 1909, apparently opening a branch in Norberg.

In support of votes for women, in 1907 she established the Storvik branch of the Women's Suffrage Association and also took part in suffrage meetings in Gästrikland, Dalarna and Hälsingland. She reported on these activities in the journal of the Allmänna Valmansförbundet, a moderate party in which she was also politically engaged.

Edit Kindvall died in Stockholm on 26 December 1951.
