= The Edit (film) =

1985 Canadian short film

- Directed by: Michael Todd
- Written by: Paul Caulfield
- Produced by: Paul Caulfield
- Starring: Michael Magee; Paul de Silva; Richard Wells; Vincent Murray
- Cinematography: Mark Irwin
- Release date: 1985
- Running time: 13 minutes
- Country: Canada
- Language: English

The Edit is a Canadian short film, directed by Michael Todd and released in 1985. The film centres on a television journalist who violates journalistic ethics by altering his story in the editing suite.

The cast includes Michael Magee, Paul de Silva, Richard Wells and Vincent Murray.

The film won the Genie Award for Best Live Action Short Drama at the 7th Genie Awards.
