= Slide show =

Presentation of a series of still images on a projection screen or other display

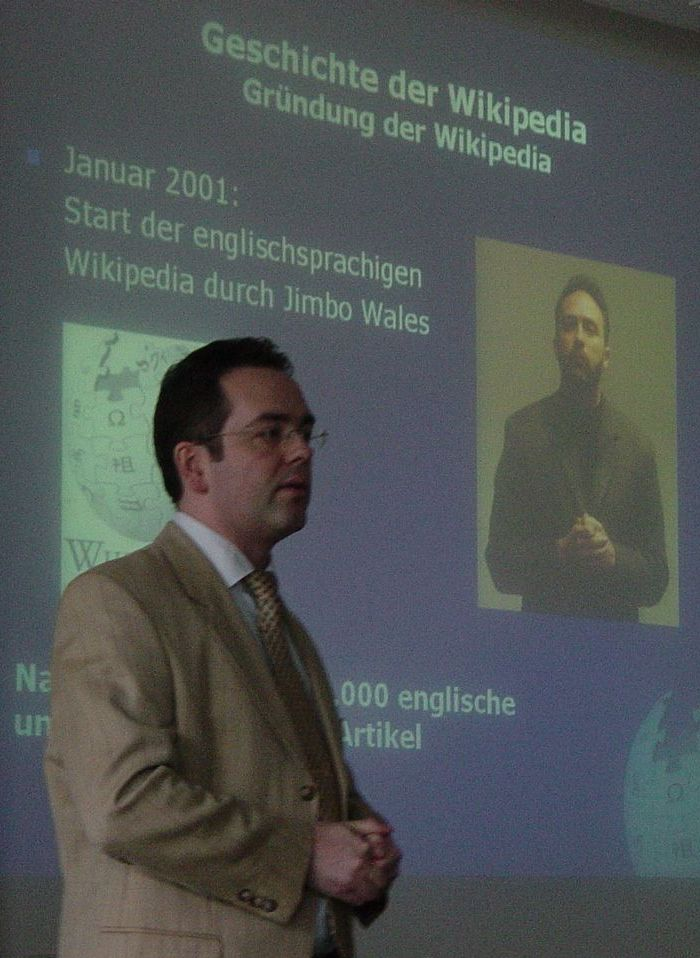
A slide show in Germany about the history of Wikipedia

A slide show, or slideshow, is a presentation consisting of a series of still images (slides) on a projection screen or electronic display device, typically in a prearranged sequence. The changes may be automatic and at regular intervals or they may be manually controlled by a presenter or the viewer. Slide shows originally consisted of a series of individual photographic slides projected onto a screen with a slide projector, as opposed to the video or computer-based visual equivalent, in which the slides are not individual physical objects.

A slide show may be a presentation of images purely for their own visual interest or artistic value, sometimes unaccompanied by description or text, or it may be used to clarify or reinforce information, ideas, comments, solutions or suggestions which are presented verbally. Slide shows are sometimes still conducted by a presenter using an apparatus such as a carousel slide projector or an overhead projector, but now the use of an electronic video display device and a computer running presentation software is typical.

== History ==
Wayang beber Gunungkidul of the Panji Inu Kertapati tale in Wahidin Sudirohusodo's house in Yogyakarta, 1902.

Pictorial presentations as a form of entertainment existed in antiquity throughout the world. In the island of Java in present-day Indonesia, the wayang beber artform narrates Panji romances behind scrolls of drawn mulberry paper.

Slide shows as known to the Western world had their beginnings in the 1600s, when hand-painted images on glass were first projected onto a wall with a "magic lantern". By the late 1700s, showmen were using magic lanterns to thrill audiences with seemingly supernatural apparitions in a popular form of entertainment called a phantasmagoria. Sunlight, candles and oil lamps were the only available light sources. The development of new, much brighter artificial light sources opened up a world of practical applications for image projection. In the 1800s, a series of hand-painted glass "lantern slides" were sometimes projected to illustrate story-telling or a lecture. Widespread and varied uses for amusement and education evolved throughout the century. By 1900, photographic images on glass had replaced hand-painted images, but the black-and-white photographs were sometimes hand-colored with transparent dyes. The production of lantern slides had become a considerable industry, with dimensions standardized at 3.25 inches high by 4 inches wide in the US and 3.25 inches square in the UK and much of Europe.

"Magic lantern shows" also served as a form of home entertainment and were especially popular with children. They continued to have a place among commercial public amusements even after the coming of projected "moving pictures". Between films, early movie theaters often featured "illustrated songs", which were community sing-alongs with the lyrics and illustrations provided by a series of projected lantern slides. Theaters also used their lanterns to project advertising slides and messages such as "Ladies, kindly remove your hats".

After 35 mm Kodachrome color film was introduced in 1936, a new standard 2×2 inch (5×5 cm) miniature lantern slide format was created to better suit the very small transparencies the film produced. In advertising, the antique "magic lantern" terminology was streamlined, so that the framed pieces of film were simply "slides" and the lantern used to project them was a "slide projector".

Home slide shows were a relatively common phenomenon in middle-class American homes during the 1950s and 1960s.

An image on 35 mm film mounted in a 2×2 inch (5×5 cm) metal, card or plastic frame is still by far the most common photographic slide format.

== Digital slide shows ==
Slide show in Xubuntu 16.04

Digital photo slide shows can be custom-made for clients from their photos, music, wedding invitations, birth announcements, or virtually any other scannable documents. Some producers call the resulting DVDs the new photomontage. Slide shows can be created not only on DVD, but also in HD video formats and as executable computer files. Photo slide show software has made it easy to create electronic digital slide shows, eliminating the need for expensive color reversal film and requiring only a digital camera and computer.

Photo slide show software often provides more options than simply showing the pictures. It is possible to add transitions, pan and zoom effects, video clips, background music, narration, captions, etc. By using computer software one therefore has the ability to enhance the presentation in a way that is not otherwise practical. The finished slide show can then be burned to a DVD, for use as a gift or for archiving, and later viewed using an ordinary DVD player.

=== Web-based slide shows ===
A web-based slide show is a slide show which can be played (viewed or presented) using a web browser. Some web based slide shows are generated from presentation software and may be difficult to change (usually unintentionally so). Others offer templates allowing the slide show to be easily edited and changed.

Compared to a fully fledged presentation program the web based slide shows are usually limited in features.

A web-based slide show is typically generated to or authored in HTML, JavaScript and CSS code (files).

== Uses ==
A well-organized slide show allows a presenter to fit visual images to an oral presentation. The old adage "A picture is worth a thousand words" holds true, in that a single image can save a presenter from speaking a paragraph of descriptive details. As with any public speaking or lecturing, a certain amount of talent, experience, and rehearsal is required to make a successful slide show presentation.

Presentation software is most commonly used in the business world, where millions of presentations are created daily. Another very important area where it is used is for instructional purposes, usually with the intention of creating a dynamic, audiovisual presentation. The relevant points to the entire presentation are put on slides, and accompany a spoken monologue.

=== In art ===
Slide shows have artistic uses as well, such as being used as a screensaver, or to provide dynamic imagery for a museum presentation, for example, or in installation art. David Byrne, among others, has created PowerPoint art. Slide shows have also been used for creating animations and games.

Since the late 1960s, visual artists have used slide shows in museums and galleries as a device, either for presenting specific information about an action or research or as a phenomenological form in itself. According to the introduction of Slide Show, an exhibition organized at the Baltimore Museum of Art: "Through the simple technology of the slide projector and 35 mm color transparency, artists discovered a tool that enabled the transformation of space through the magnification of projected pictures, texts, and images." Although some artists have not necessarily used 35 mm or color slides, and some, such as Robert Barry, have even abandoned images for texts, 35 mm color film slides are most commonly used. The images are sometimes accompanied by written text, either in the same slide or as an intertitle. Some artists, such as James Coleman and Robert Smithson, have used a voice-over with their slide presentations.

Slide shows have also been used by artists who use other media such as painting and sculpture to present their work publicly. In recent years there has been a growing use of the slide show by a younger generation of artists. The non-profit organization Slideluck Potshow holds slide show events globally, featuring works by amateur and professional artists, photographers, and gallerists. Participants in the event bring food, potluck style, and have a social dinner before the slide show begins.

Other known artists who have used slide shows in their work include Bas Jan Ader, Francis Alys, Jan Dibbets, Dan Graham, Rodney Graham, Nan Goldin, Louise Lawler, Ana Mendieta, Jonathan Monk, Dennis Oppenheim, Allan Sekula, Carey Young and Krzysztof Wodiczko.

=== In entertainment ===
Some comedians have begun prominently featuring slide shows as part of their stand-up comedy performances, including Don McMillan, Dave Gorman, Aparna Nancherla, Sarah Sherman, Conner O'Malley, Sam Campbell, Lou Wall, and Demetri Martin. New comedy series have also been created in which a rotating cast of comedians deliver humorous slide show presentations, notably: the Dave series Comedians Giving Lectures (2019-22), hosted by Sara Pascoe; the Dropout series Smartypants (2024-present), hosted by Rekha Shankar; and the Nebula series Abolish Everything (2025-present), hosted by Chandler Dean.

During COVID-19 lockdowns, virtual "PowerPoint parties", using the screen sharing feature on Zoom and other video calling platforms, became popular on social media. In early 2024, PowerPoint parties or "PowerPoint nights" attracted renewed attention on TikTok, described as a Generation Z house party trend. CNN and BuzzFeed News attribute the origins of the PowerPoint party to "Drink Talk Learn" events started by engineering students at the University of Waterloo in 2012.

== Copyright status ==
Under United States copyright law, a slide show may be considered a type of "audiovisual work". Audiovisual works are defined in the statute as "works that consist of a series of related images which are intrinsically intended to be shown by the use of machines, or devices such as projectors, viewers, or electronic equipment, together with accompanying sounds, if any, regardless of the nature of the material objects, such as films or tapes, in which the works are embodied." (17 U.S.C. § 101) To be considered an audiovisual work, the slide show must consist of a series of related images that combine to form a cohesive work. A slide show consisting of a single image or multiple unrelated images is not an audiovisual work. Microsoft PowerPoint file formats (.ppt, .pps, or .pptx) are accepted by the U.S. Copyright Office for online copyright registrations.

== See also ==
- Home movie
- Photo slideshow software
- PowerPoint animation
- Presentation software
- Multi-image
- Slide-tape
- Filmstrip
- LCD projector
- Wireless clicker
