= KineMaster =

Mobile video editing application

- Industry: Software
- Founded: 10 August 2013; 13 years ago
- Headquarters: South Korea
- Parent: KineMaster Corporation
- Website: www.kinemaster.com

KineMaster is a mobile video editing application developed by KineMaster Corporation, a South Korean company. The company went public as NexStreaming, and renamed to KineMaster in 2019.

As of 2021, the CEO of KineMaster was Lim Il-taek. As of 2020, the app had an average of 68 million monthly active users.

== History ==
KineMaster was released in 2013, under the name NexStreaming then was changed to KineMaster on March 28, 2019. The app was made available for both Android and iOS phones.
