= Showcase Presentations =

Rainbow Software's Showcase Presentation System was the world's first screen-based presentation system.

== History ==
Launched in 1981 by London-based Rainbow Software (now Showcase Presentations Ltd) and running on Apple II computers with just 16k of RAM, the Showcase Presentation System was the first commercial computer-based presentation system displaying directly onto RGB monitors or projectors.

Rainbow's first client was Grey Advertising in London closely followed by Ogilvy & Mather and many others. Customers claimed that it paid for itself in a single presentation. Pricing was given as £5,000 for the system in 1984, whereas presentation slides reportedly cost around £15 to £30 per slide.

Showcase used programmable duotone colouring to maintain "hi res" mode, and employed a range of proportionally spaced, properly designed fonts. In 1983, two years later, Steve Jobs was still trying to persuade his embryonic Mac development team that such fonts were important.

The IBM PC didn't make much impact until the mid-1980s; Rainbow lacked the resources to redevelop the system from scratch on to this new format with poor graphic capabilities.

The Rainbow name was eventually dropped in favour of Showcase Presentations Ltd, which became a service company.

By 1987, a product from General Parametrics called VideoShow allowed better quality presentations from a PC, and Showcase adopted this and started to develop into a broader consultancy business. In 1990, Windows 3 appeared and combined with a Compaq Portable 386 and the first version of a new program called PowerPoint, the route to the future seemed clear.

Since then there have been many changes in hardware and software – and particularly in display devices, speed and resolution – but the same general combination of hardware and software has prevailed.

Showcase Presentations rapidly became a high-profile support company, creating presentations for major blue chip companies and working around the world. The company was eventually dissolved in 2020.
