= Clip art =

Graphic illustrations created for reuse by others

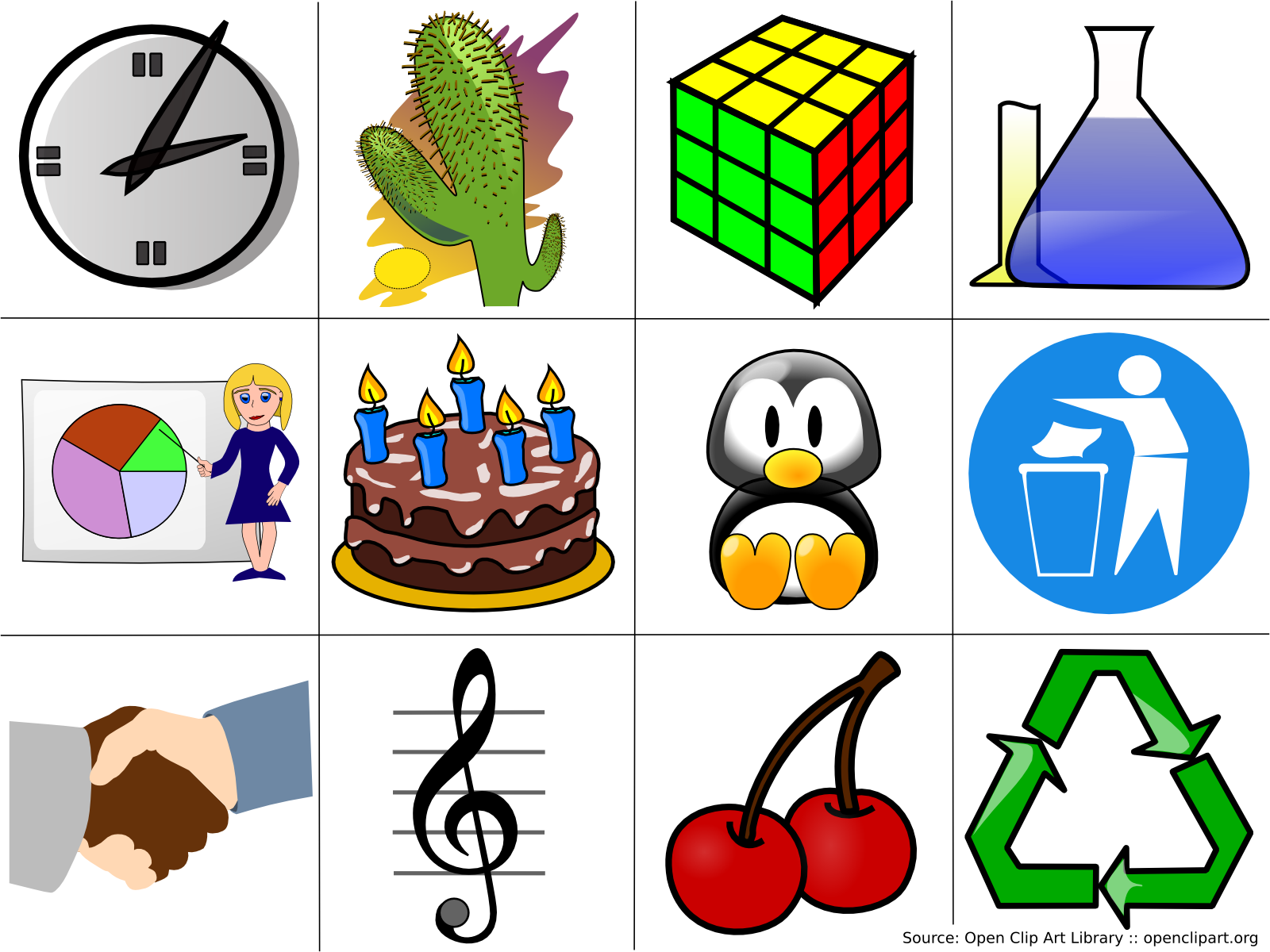
Examples of computer clip art, from Openclipart

Clip art (also clipart, clip-art) is a type of graphic art. Pieces are pre-made images used to illustrate any medium. Today, clip art is used extensively and comes in many forms, both electronic and printed. However, most clip art today is created, distributed, and used in a digital form. Since its inception, clip art has evolved to include a wide variety of content, file formats, illustration styles, and licensing restrictions. It is generally composed exclusively of illustrations (created by hand or by computer software), and does not include stock photography.

== History ==
The term "clipart" originated from the practice of physically cutting images from pre-existing printed works for use in other publishing projects. Originally called "printer's cuts," "stock cuts" or "electrotype cuts," before the advent of computers in desktop publishing, clip art was used through a process called paste up. Many clip art images of this era qualified as line art. In this process, the clip art images are cut out by hand from booklets or sheets sold by stock art studios or print companies (such as Dynamic Graphics or Volk Clip Art) and then attached via adhesives to a board representing a scale size of the finished, printed work. After the addition of text and art created through phototypesetting or dry-transfer lettering, the finished, camera-ready pages (called mechanicals) were sent to print.

Since the 1990s, nearly all publishers have replaced the paste up process with desktop publishing. After the introduction of mass-produced personal computers such as the IBM PC in 1981 and the Apple Macintosh in 1984, the widespread use of clip art by consumers became possible through the invention of desktop publishing. For the IBM PC, the first library of professionally drawn clip art was provided with VCN ExecuVision, introduced in 1983. These images were used in business presentations, as well as for other types of presentations. It was the Apple Computer, with its GUI which provided desktop publishing with the tools required to make it a reality for consumers. The LaserWriter laser printer (introduced in late 1985), as well as software maker Aldus PageMaker in 1985, helped to make professional quality desktop publishing a reality, with consumer desktop computers.

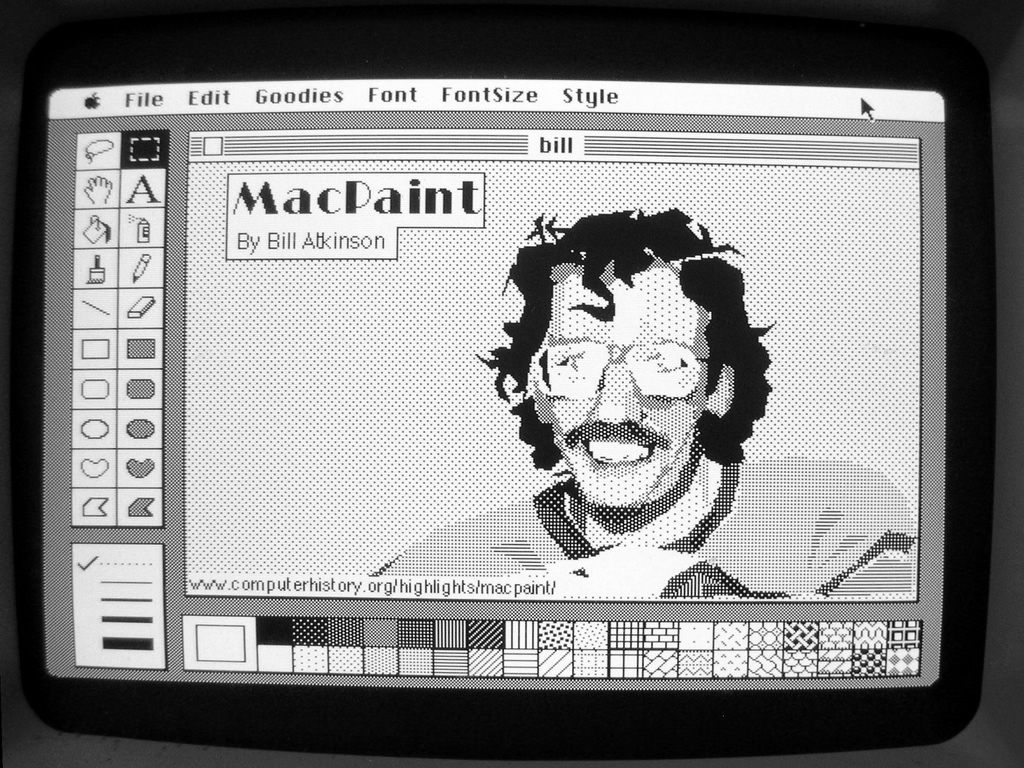
A MacPaint illustration of Bill Atkinson, the software's creator

After 1986, desktop publishing generated a widespread need for pre-made, electronic images as consumers began to produce newsletters and brochures using their own computers. Electronic clip art emerged to fill the need. Early electronic clip art was simple line art or bitmap images due to the lack of sophisticated electronic illustration tools. With the introduction of the Apple Macintosh program MacPaint, consumers were provided the ability to edit and use bit-mapped clip art for the first time. One of the first successful electronic clip art pioneers was T/Maker Company, a Mountain View, California, company, which had its early roots with an alternative word processor WriteNow, commissioned for the Macintosh by Steve Jobs. Beginning in 1984, T/Maker took advantage of the capability of the Macintosh to provide bit-mapped graphics in black and white; by publishing small, retail collections of these images under the brand name "ClickArt". The first version of "ClickArt" was a mixed collection of images designed for personal use. The illustrators who created the first "serious" clip art for business/organizational (professional) use were Mike Mathis, Joan Shogren, and Dennis Fregger; published by T/Maker in 1984 as "ClickArt Publications".

In 1986, the first vector-based clip art disc was released by Composite, a small desktop publishing company based in Eureka, California. The black-and-white art was painstakingly created by Rick Siegfried with MacDraw, sometimes using hundreds of simple objects combined to create complex images. It was released on a single-sided floppy disc. Also in 1986, Adobe Systems introduced Adobe Illustrator for the Macintosh, allowing home computer users the first opportunity to manipulate vector art in a GUI. This made the higher-resolution vector art possible and in 1987 T/Maker published the first vector-based clip art images made with Illustrator, despite widespread unfamiliarity with the Bézier curves required to edit vector art. However, graphic designers and many consumers quickly realized the enormous advantages of vector art, and T/Maker's clip art became the gold standard of the industry in the late 1980s and early 1990s. In 1994, T/Maker was sold to Deluxe Corp and then two years later to its main rival, Broderbund.

With the widespread adoption of the CD-ROM in the early 1990s, several pre-computer clip art companies such as Dover Publications also began offering electronic clip art.

The mid-1990s ushered in more innovation in the clip art industry, as well as a marketing focus on quantity over quality. Even T/Maker, whose success was built upon selling small, high-quality clip art packages of approximately 200 images, began to get interested in the volume clip art market. In March 1995, T/Maker became the exclusive publisher of over 500,000 copyright-free images which was, at the time, one of the world's largest clip art libraries. This licensing agreement was subsequently transferred to Broderbund. In 1996, Zedcor (later rebranded to ArtToday, Inc. and then Clipart.com) was the first company to offer clip art images, illustrations, and photos for download as part of an online subscription. Also during this period, word processing companies, including Microsoft, began offering clip art as a built-in feature of their products. In 1996, Microsoft Word 6.0 included only 82 WMF clip art files as part of its default installation. In 2014, Microsoft offered clip art as part of over 140,000 media elements on the Microsoft Office website.

Other companies such as Nova Development and Clip Art Incorporated also pioneered the marketing of large clip art collections in the late 1990s, including Nova's "Art Explosion" series, which sold clip art in increasingly large libraries up to a million images. Between 1998 and 2001, T/Maker's clip art assets were sold each year as a result of some of the largest mergers and acquisitions in the computer software industry, including those of The Learning Company (in 1998) and Mattel (in 1999). All of T/Maker's clip art is currently marketed through the Broderbund division of the Irish company Riverdeep.

In the early 2000s, the World Wide Web continued to gain popularity as a retail software distribution channel, and several other companies started to license clip art through online, searchable libraries, including iCLIPART.com (part of Vital Imagery Ltd.), WeddingClipart.com (part of Letters and Arts Incorporated), and GraphicsFactory.com (part of Clip Art Incorporated). Because of the Web, clip art is now not only sold through retail channels as packaged bundles of images, but also as individual images and subscriptions to entire libraries (which allow you to download an unlimited number of images for the duration of the subscription). In the mid-2000s, the clip art market is segmented in several different ways, including the data type, the art style, the delivery medium, and the marketing method.

On December 1, 2014, Microsoft officially ended its support for the online Clip Art library in Microsoft Office products. These programs now guide users to the Bing image search. Clip art is divided into two different data types represented by many different file formats: bitmap and vector art. Clip art vendors may provide images of just one type or both. The delivery medium of a clip art product varies from different types of traditionally boxed retail packages to online download sites. Clip art is sold via both traditional and web-based retail channels (as with Nova Development products), as well as via online, searchable libraries (as with Clipart.com). Clip art vendors typically market clip art by focusing either on quantity or vertical market specialty. The marketing method often goes hand in hand with the art style of the clip art sold. To compete largely on quantity, some clip art vendors must produce or license new and old clip art collections in volume. Clip art marketed in this way is often less expensive but simpler in structure and detail, as is typified by cartoons, line art, and symbols. Clip art which is sold according to smaller, specialized subject genres tends to be more complex, modern, detailed, and expensive.

== AI-generated clip art ==
From the late 2010s onward, advances in generative AI began to change how clip art is produced and sold. Early experiments used generative adversarial networks and other machine-learning models to synthesize images from datasets of existing artwork. The shift became visible to everyday users after the release of large text-to-image models in the early 2020s, including systems such as DALL-E, Stable Diffusion, and Midjourney. By the mid-2020s, newer image models such as OpenAI's ChatGPT Images 2.0 (API model name gpt-image-2) added higher-fidelity generation and stronger instruction-following for production-style illustration work. These tools let a user describe a subject in plain language and receive a new illustration in seconds, without searching a fixed catalog.

For clip art specifically, the practical effect is a move away from browsing static libraries toward on-demand creation. Traditional clip art was drawn once, indexed by keyword, and licensed in bulk. AI clip art is generated per request or per brief, which makes it easier to match an exact theme, audience, or project (for example, a classroom worksheet, a wedding invitation, or a small-business flyer) without settling for the closest match in a pre-made collection. Many services now output PNG files with transparent backgrounds, square aspect ratios suited to layout work, and styles that mimic flat illustration, line art, or simple vector looks. Some platforms also sell coordinated sets, sometimes called theme packs, where multiple images share palette, line weight, and subject matter so they read as one collection rather than unrelated one-offs. Independent marketplaces such as Etsy have long sold downloadable clip art packs; AI-native shops now sell similar deliverables (instant ZIP downloads, commercial licensing) without a handmade catalog behind every image.

The business model of the category is changing along with the technology. Subscription clip art libraries and disc-based collections dominated the 1990s and 2000s. AI-native clip art sites often combine free samples or limited free generation with paid credits or memberships, and they may ship finished assets as instant downloads rather than as entries in a searchable archive alone. Dedicated clip art storefronts have appeared that treat AI output as retail inventory: curated packs for common use cases, custom pack builders driven by a text brief, and commercial licensing bundled with the download. Some dedicated clip art sites have published editorial histories of the category, documenting its development from paste-up production through AI generation.

The rise of AI generation has also raised new questions that older clip art markets handled differently. Copyright and training data disputes apply to model-built images in ways that do not map cleanly onto royalty-free library licenses from the CD-ROM era. Users must still verify terms of use, commercial rights, and whether an image is safe to publish. Quality control is another ongoing issue: models can produce inconsistent style across a set, miss small details, or fail transparency and edge cleanup until post-processing is applied. Despite those limits, AI clip art has lowered the cost and time to obtain usable illustrations for casual and small-scale publishing, and it has pushed legacy stock and clip art vendors toward search, AI-assisted creation, or hybrid libraries that mix human art with generated content.

== File formats ==
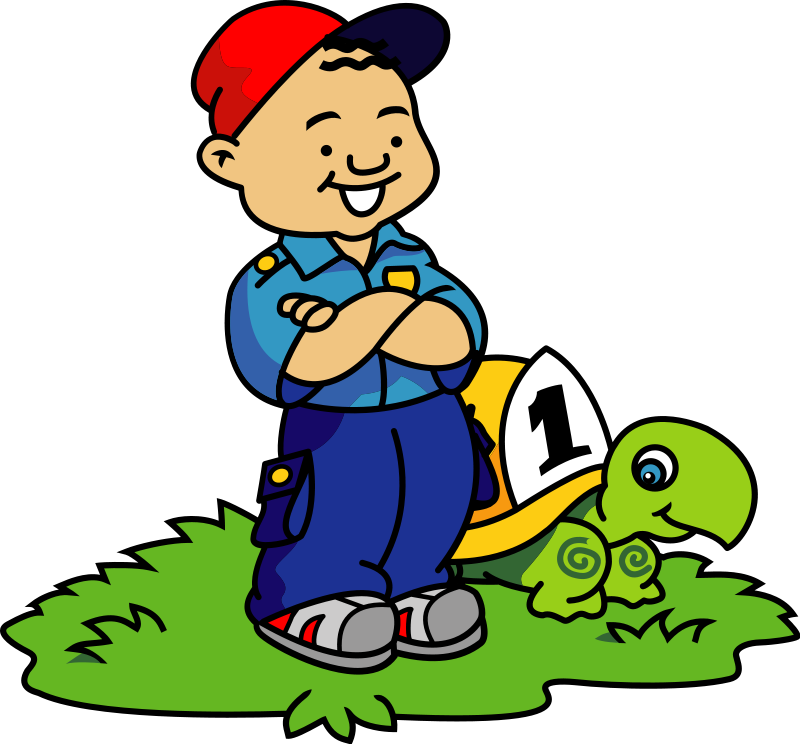
Boy and Turtle clip art, from Openclipart

Electronic clip art is available in several different file formats. It is important for clip art users to understand the differences between file formats so that they can use an appropriate image file and get the resolution and detail results they need.

Clip art file formats are divided into 2 different types: bitmap or vector graphics. Bitmap (or "rasterized") file formats are used to describe rectangular images made up of a grid of colored or grayscale pixels. Scanned photos, for example, make use of a bitmap file format. Bitmap images are always limited in quality by their resolution, which must be fixed at the time the file is created. If the image is not rectangular, then it is saved on a default background color (usually white) defined by the smallest bounding rectangle in which the image fits. Because of their fixed resolution, printing bitmap images can easily produce grainy, jaggy, or blurry results if the resolution is not ideally suited to the printer resolution. In addition, bitmap images become grainy when they are scaled larger than their intended resolution. A few bitmap file formats (such as Apple's PICT format) support alpha channels, which allow bitmap images to have transparent backgrounds or an image selection which uses antialiasing. Most common web-based file formats such as GIF, JPEG, and PNG are bitmap file formats. The GIF File format is one of the simplest, low-resolution bitmap file formats, only supporting 256 colors per image. As a result, however, GIF files can be extremely small in file size. Other common bitmap file formats are BMP (Windows bitmap), TGA, and TIFF. Most clip art is provided in a low resolution, bitmap file format which is unsuitable for scaling, transparent backgrounds, or good-quality printed materials. However, bitmap file formats are ideal for photos, especially when combined with lossy data compression algorithms such as those available for JPEG files.

In contrast to the grid format of bitmap images, Vector graphics file formats use geometric modeling to describe an image as a series of points, lines, curves, and polygons. Because the image is described using geometric data instead of fixed pixels, the image can be scaled to any size while retaining "resolution independence", meaning that the image can be printed at the highest resolution a printer supports, resulting in a clear, crisp image. Vector file formats are usually superior in resolution and ease of editing as compared to bitmap file formats, but are not as widely supported by software and are not well-suited for storing pixel-specific data such as scanned photographs. In the early years of electronic clip art, vector illustrations were limited to simple line art representations. However, by the early 2000s, vector illustration tools could produce virtually the same illustrations as bitmap illustration tools, while still providing all of the advantages of vector file formats. The most common vector file format is Adobe's EPS (Encapsulated PostScript) file format. Microsoft has a much simpler, less sophisticated vector file format called WMF (Windows Metafile). The World Wide Web Consortium has developed a new, XML-based vector file format called SVG (Scalable Vector Graphics) and all major modern web browsers - including Mozilla Firefox, Internet Explorer 9, Google Chrome, Opera, and Safari have at least some degree of support for SVG and can render the markup directly. For those with image-editing experience or interest to work with vector file formats, vector clip art provides the most flexible, highest quality images.

== Image rights ==
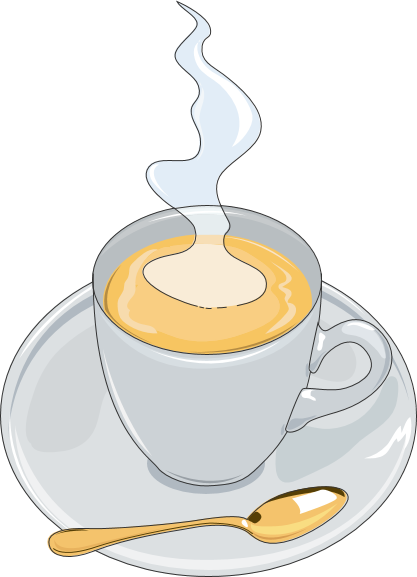
Clip art of a cup of coffee shared under CC-BY-3.0 license

All clip art usage is governed by the terms of individual copyrights and usage rights. The three most common categories of image rights are royalty-free, rights managed, and public domain.

Most commercial clip art is sold with a limited royalty-free license which allows customers to use the image for most personal, educational and non-profit applications. Some royalty-free clip art also includes limited commercial rights (the right to use images in for-profit products). However, royalty-free image rights often vary from vendor to vendor. Some fine art, clip art is still sold on a rights-managed basis. However, this type of image rights has seen a steep decline in the past 20 years as royalty-free licenses have become the preferred model for clip art. Public domain images continue to be one of the most popular types of clip art because the image rights are free. However, many images that are erroneously described as part of the public domain are actually copyrighted, and thus illegal to use without proper permissions. The main cause for this confusion is because once a public domain image is redrawn or edited in any way, it becomes a brand new image which is copyrightable by the editor.

The United States District Court ruled in 1999 as part of Bridgeman Art Library v. Corel Corp that exact copies of public domain images were not restricted under US copyright law, however the scope of this ruling only applies to photographs currently. It is originality, not skill, neither experience nor effort, which affects the copyrightability of derivative images. In fact, the US Supreme Court in Feist v. Rural ruled that the difficulty of labor and expenses must be rejected as considerations in copyrightability. Copyright on other clipart stands in contrast to exact replica photographs of paintings. The large clip art libraries produced by Dover Publications or the University of South Florida's Clipart ETC project are based on public domain images, but because they have been scanned and edited by hand, they are now derivative works and copyrighted, subject to very specific usage policies. In order for a clip art image based on a public domain source to be truly in the public domain, the proper rights must be granted by the individual or organization which digitized and edited the original source of the image.

The popularity of the Web has facilitated widespread copying of pirated clip art which is then sold or given away as "free clip art". Virtually all images published after January 1, 1923 still have copyright protection under the laws of most countries. Creative Commons licenses is the forefront of the copyleft movement or a new form of free digital clipart and photo image distribution. Many websites such as Flickr and Interartcenter use Creative Commons as an alternative to the full attribution copyrights. The exception for clip art illustrations created after 1923 are those which are specifically donated to the public domain by the artist or publisher. For vector art, the open source community established Openclipart in 2004 as a clearinghouse for images which are legitimately donated to the public domain by their copyright owners. By 2014, the library contained over 50,000 vector images.

== See also ==
- Icon set
- Graphic design
- Non-photo blue
