= Audiovisual education =

Method of education with audiovisual elements

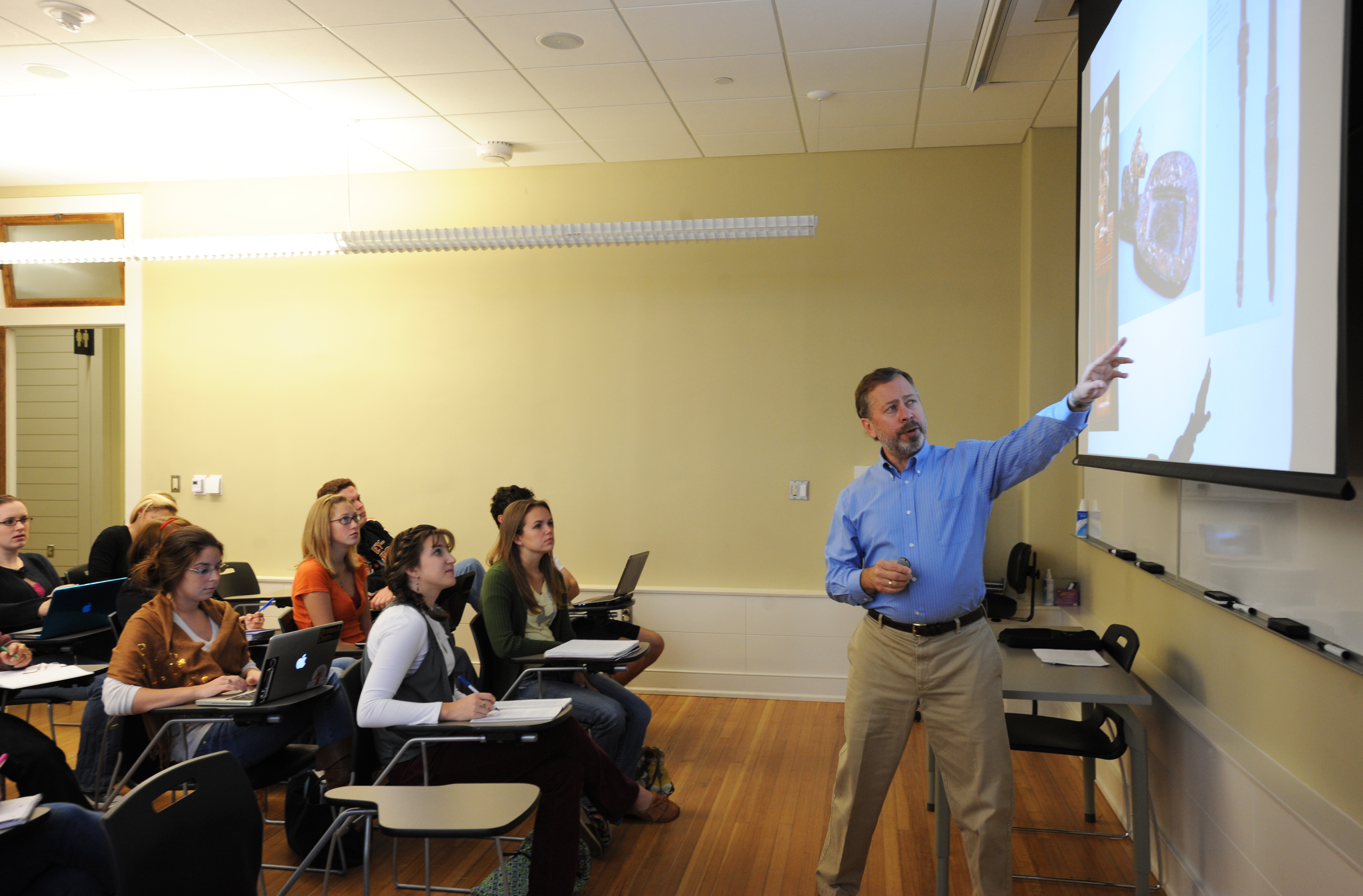
A professor using an LCD projector as an instructional aid

Audiovisual (AV) education or multimedia-based education (MBE) is an instruction method where particular attention is paid to the audiovisual or multimedia presentation of the material to improve comprehension and retention.

== History ==
The concept of audiovisual aids can be traced back to the seventeenth century, when John Amos Comenius, a Bohemian educator, used illustrations of everyday objects as teaching aids in his book, Orbis Sensualium Pictus. Other early advocates of using visual materials in teaching included Jean-Jacques Rousseau, John Locke and J.H Pestalozzi.

Audiovisual aids were also widely used by the armed forces during World War II. The United States Air Force created over 400 training films and 600 film strips to be shown to military personnel.

Various types of audiovisual materials range from film strips, microforms, slides, projected opaque materials, tape recordings, and flashcards. In the current digital world, audiovisual aids have grown exponentially with multimedia such as educational DVDs, PowerPoint, television educational series, YouTube, and other online materials. The goal of audio-visual aids is to enhance the teacher's ability to present the lesson in a simple, effective, and easy-to-understand way for the students. Audiovisual materials make learning more permanent since students use more than one sense. It is important to create awareness for the state and federal ministry of education as policymakers in secondary schools of the need to teach audiovisual resources as the main teaching pedagogy in curricula. The outcome is promoting audiovisual material in secondary schools because they lack the resources to produce it. Visual instruction makes abstract ideas more concrete for the learners. This is to provide a basis for schools to understand the important roles in encouraging and supporting the use of audiovisual resources. In addition, studies have shown a significant difference between the use and non-use of audiovisual material in teaching and learning.

== Objectives ==
1. To strengthen students' learning skills and make teaching-learning more effective.
2. To attract and retain learners' attention
3. To generate interest across different levels of students
4. To develop lesson plans that are simple and easy to follow
5. To make the class more interactive and interesting
6. To focus on a student-centred approach

== Advantages ==
Digital tools can be used to improve the teaching-learning process in the modern world. The most digital common tool used in the secondary school classroom over recent years has beenPowerPoint slides, which are intended make the class more interesting, dynamic, and effective. Moreover, they may also help introduce new topics easily. The use of effectively designed and presented Powerpoint slides may help the students remember a concept, process or method for a longer period. They can convey the same meaning as words but more effectively, thus helping to bring successful outcomes to learning.

Integrating technology into the classroom helps students to experience things virtually or vicariously. For example, if the teacher wants to give a lesson on the Taj Mahal, only some of the students in India may have visited the place, but you can show it through a video, allowing the students to see the monument with their own eyes. Although first-hand experience is the best way of educative experience, such an experience can only sometimes be done practically, so we need to have a substitution.

Using audio-visual aids helps maintain discipline in the class since all the student's attention is focused on learning. This interactive session also develops critical thinking and reasoning which are important components of the teaching-learning process.

Audiovisual provides opportunities for effective communication between teachers and students in learning. For example, in a study on English as Foreign Language (EFL) classrooms, the difficulties faced by EFL learners are lack of motivation, lack of exposure to the target language, and lack of pronunciation by the teacher, and such challenges can be overcome by Audio as the purpose of communication and Visual as more exposure.

Students learn when they are motivated and curious about something. Traditional verbal instructions can be boring and painful for students. However, using audio-visual motivates students by piquing their curiosity and stimulating their interest in the subjects.

== Disadvantages ==
One should have an idea that too much audio-visual material used at one time can result in boredom. It is applicable only if it is implemented effectively. Considering that each teaching/learning situation varies, it is essential to know that not all concepts can be learned effectively through audiovisuals. Most of the time, equipment like projectors, speakers, and headphones are costly; hence, some schools need more money to afford them. It takes a lot of time for teachers to prepare lessons to have interactive classroom sessions. Also, the teacher's valuable time in gaining familiarity with new equipment may need to be recovered. Some students may feel reluctant to ask questions while the film is playing, which can be a physical barrier in small rooms. In places where electricity is not available, i.e., in rural areas, it is not feasible to use audio-visual aids that require electricity.

== Conclusion ==
Audiovisual aids are essential tools for teaching the learning process. It helps the teacher to present the lesson effectively, and students learn and retain the concepts better for a longer duration. The use of audio-visual aids improves student's critical and analytical thinking. It helps to remove abstract concepts through visual presentation. However, improper and unplanned use of these aids can negatively affect the learning outcome. Therefore, teachers should be well trained through in-service training to maximize the benefits of using these aids. The curriculum should be designed with options for activity-based learning through audio-visual aids. In addition, the government should fund resources to purchase audio-visual aids in schools.

== Equipment used for audiovisual presentations ==
- Television
- LCD projectors
- Film projectors
- Slide projectors
- Opaque projectors (episcopes and epidiascopes)
- Overhead projectors
