= RPTV =

RPTV may refer to:

- Rear-projection television
- RPTV (TV channel), a Philippine TV channel
