= Rear-projection television =

Large-screen television display system

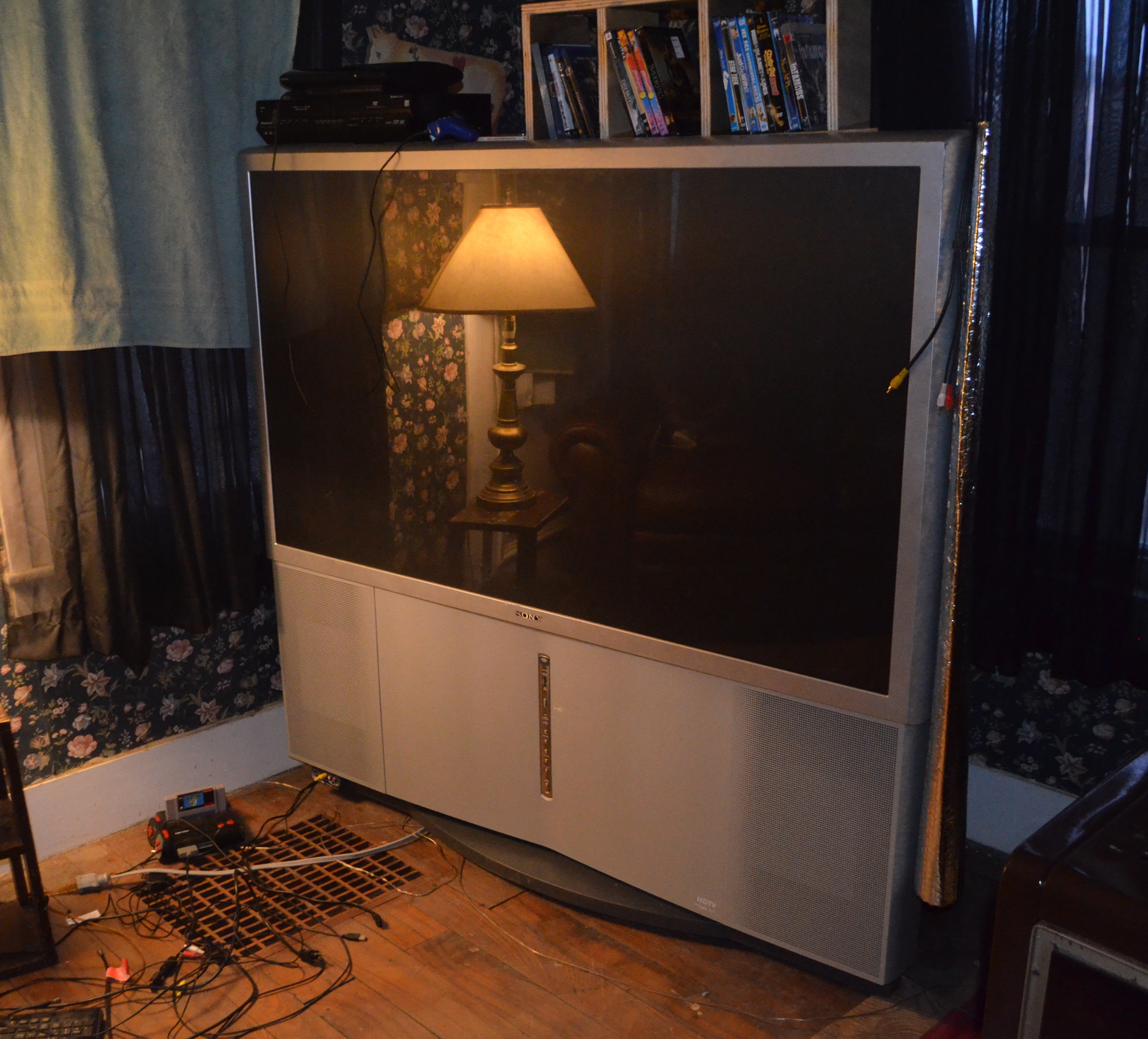
Mid-2000s RPTV with HDTV tuner and YPbPr input as well as DVI (digital) video inputs.

Rear-projection television (RPTV) is a type of large-screen television display technology in which the image is projected inside the cabinet from behind onto a diffusing screen at the front. Unlike traditional televisions, a rear-projection television converts electrical video signals into beams of light, directed by an optical lens and mirror system. Until approximately 2006, most of the relatively affordable consumer large screen TVs up to 100 inches (250 cm) used rear-projection technology. A variation is a video projector, using similar technology, which projects onto a screen.

Three types of projection systems are used in projection TVs. CRT rear-projection TVs were the earliest, and while they were the first to exceed 40 in (100 cm), they were also bulky and the picture was unclear at close range. Newer technologies include DLP (reflective micromirror chip), LCD projectors, Laser TV and LCoS. They are capable of displaying high-definition video up to 1080p resolution, and examples include Sony's SXRD (Silicon X-tal Reflective Display), JVC's D-ILA (Digital Direct Drive Image Light Amplifier) and MicroDisplay Corporation's Liquid Fidelity.

== Background and history ==
=== Necessity ===
Cathode-ray tube technology was very limited in the early days of television. It relied on conventional glass blowing methods largely unchanged in centuries. Since the tube had to contain a very high vacuum, the glass was under considerable stress. This, together with the low deflection angle of CRTs of the era, meant the practical size of CRTs was limited without increasing their depth. The largest practical tube that could be made that was capable of being mounted horizontally in a television cabinet of acceptable depth was around nine inches (23 cm). Twelve-inch (30 cm) tubes could be manufactured, but these were so long that they had to be mounted vertically and viewed via an angled mirror in the top of the cabinet. In 1936, the British government persuaded the British Broadcasting Corporation to launch a public high definition (for the era (Note: Although the 240 line and 405 line systems used would not be considered 'high definition' by modern standards, they were in the context of the day)) television broadcasting service. (Note: Germany was broadcasting television signals in 1934, but this was only a 180 line system) The principal driver for the British government's move was to establish cathode ray tube production facilities which it believed would be vital if the anticipated Second World War was to materialise.

The ability to correct the deflection signals for aberrations in tube geometry had not yet been developed, and it was necessary to make tubes that were relatively long compared with their screen size to minimise distortion. However, because the tube face had to be convex to provide resistance to air pressure, this mitigated the problem but only if the apparent deflection centre was more or less at the centre of curvature of the screen. This necessitated a tube that was relatively long for its screen size. The accelerating voltage used for these tubes was very low by later standards and even a twelve-inch tube only ran from a 5000-volt supply. The early white phosphors were not as efficient as later offerings and these early televisions had to be watched in subdued lighting.

=== Solution ===
In 1937, both Philips and His Master's Voice (HMV) put on display at the Radiolympia show in London, television sets that had a screen size of 25 inches based on the same MS11 (Note: The tube number was made up as M-Magnetic focus; S-Green phosphor and 11-the overall diameter of the screen end of the tube in centimetres. It was common in Britain at this time to designate the size of televisions by the diagonal of the visible screen size. Thus although the MS11 was a 4 1/2-inch tube, it would have been described in the literature of the time as a four-inch tube. By contrast: America measured television sizes by the overall outside diameter of the Cathode ray tube though did use the screen diagonal for projection sets. Britain adopted this principal once set manufacturing restarted following the war. Television sizes were (and still are) designated in imperial inches in both the US and Britain. Elsewhere, sizes may well be in centimetres, but the set's model number usually betrays its imperial size.) Philips/Mullard (Note: The Dutch Philips company owned the British Mullard valve company) tube. These had been the subject of an advertising campaign prior to the show which generated much interest. The television back projected the image from a 4 1/2-inch tube onto a 25-inch etched celluloid screen sandwiched between two sheets of glass for protection. The tube size was dictated by the fact that it was the largest tube that could be made with a flat screen. It had not been appreciated at this time that a curved screen was optically better if the centre of curvature of the screen was in roughly the same place as the centre of curvature of the mirror. The tube was mounted vertically in the bottom of the cabinet with the screen pointing downward towards a concave mirror which reflected the image upward toward an angled mirror at the top of the cabinet onto the 25-inch screen. The top of the tube mirror box had a Schmidt lens (Note: These were originally designed for astronomical telescopes to allow a spherical mirror to be used instead of a parabolic mirror which would have been distortion free but more expensive to produce. The Schmidt lens improved the focussing by correcting the spherical distortion from the image. They fell out of favour in telescopes because the presence of a lens did disperse the image and reduce the resolution compared with an uncorrected parabolic mirror. This was never a problem in projection televisions as the image was of low resolution.) to correct aberrations. Because the picture had to be magnified to illuminate a screen that had about 100 times the area of the picture on the tube face, the image on the tube had to be very bright indeed. To achieve the required brightness, the tube was driven from a 25,000 volt accelerating supply. (Note: As a rule of thumb in 1937, a direct view television cathode ray tube had an accelerating voltage of about 400 volts per inch of diameter usually rounded to the nearest thousand. Thus a nine-inch tube had an accelerating voltage of 4000 volts.) As betrayed by the tube type number, the phosphor was green which was brighter for a given beam current that the contemporary white phosphors.

Unfortunately, both Philips and HMV had to withdraw their sets from exhibition by the afternoon of the first day as the cathode ray tubes had failed in both cases. Customers who had purchased these sets were disappointed to discover that their tubes rarely lasted longer than a few weeks (bearing in mind that there was only one hour of television broadcasting each day). By November 1937, Philips decided that it was more economic to buy the sets back rather than keep replacing tubes under warranty, which were becoming harder to source as the demand outstripped supply. (Note: It is not known if Philips paid for the labour costs involved in replacing the tubes. At this time in the UK, consumer law did not require labour costs to be paid, and consequently warranties generally excluded such costs.) No information is available as to how HMV handled the problem.

By 1938, Philips had substantially overcome the shortcomings of the previous cathode ray tube to produce the Philips/Mullard MS11/1 (Note: The '/1' meant that the tube was electrically and optically very similar to the original MS11. However, the latter could not be substituted for the former in the earlier set as the required heater current was larger.) projection tube. This new tube was basically similar but had a larger cathode that required more heater power which was able to support a higher beam current. (Note: Even though the maximum beam current was specified as 2mA, this did represent a power of 50 watts at 25,000 volts.) This new tube retained the green phosphor screen of the earlier tube. The television set also had a smaller 21-inch screen which was roughly three quarters of the area of the previous year's model which meant that the tube did not have to be driven so hard. Purchasers of this later model only got to use it for a year or less as television broadcasting was suspended in 1939 for the duration of the Second World War. Both models of the television had a problem in that the high accelerating voltage on the tube meant that it produced substantial X-radiation. This was not widely looked at as a concern in the 1930s. (Note: At the time, the necessary equipment to produce X-rays at home along with the ability to take photographs was freely available to buy in 1938 - from all good toyshops) Fortunately most of this radiation passed through the bottom of the set from the downward pointing tube.

In the United States of America, television broadcasting became more widespread at the end of the Second World War. Although cathode ray tube technology had improved during the war such that tubes became shorter for their size, as it was now possible to correct distortions, twelve inches was still the practical limit on size. However, it was now possible to mount a twelve-inch tube horizontally in an acceptable cabinet size. As a result of these size limitations, rear projection systems became popular as a way of producing television sets with a screen size larger than 12 inches. Using a 3 or 4 inch monochrome CRT driven at a very high accelerating voltage for the size (usually 25,000 volts though RCA did produce a larger five inch tube that required 27,000 volts.), the tube produced the extremely bright picture which was projected via a Schmidt lens and mirror assembly onto a semi-translucent screen of typically 22.5 to 30 inches diagonal in size using an optical system practically identical to the earlier Philips system described above. The only change was that RCA used the optically superior convex screen on the tube having figured out that the Schmidt lens did not have to correct for the curvature of the tube face but only the spherical aberration of the mirror. The resultant picture was darker than with a direct view CRT and had to be watched in very subdued lighting. The degree to which the tube was driven meant that the tube had a relatively short life.

When British television broadcasting resumed in June 1946, television production was slow to resume mainly due to shortages of materials following the war. As already noted, twelve inches was still the practical upper limit for direct view cathode ray tubes. In response, in 1950, Philips, via Mullard, introduced a new projection tube, the MW6/2. (Note: There was never a simple MW6. The 'W' in the tube type designated that the phosphor was now white. The '6' meant an approximately six-centimetre diameter. It is possible that the '/2' part of the tube number referred to the tube being a nominally two-inch tube as there was never a '/1'. However: this did not become a standard practice as once Philips/Mullard introduced newer and larger tubes, the first number came to designate the tube size in centimetres and the second number (separated by a hyphen) bore no relation to any physical aspect and just served to differentiate tubes that were the same size but of different characteristics.) Although the basic idea of the tube had not changed, it was smaller at just 2 1/2 inches and now featured a convex screen face, taking advantage of the intervening American developments. It was also around four inches shorter and now featured a more efficient white phosphor developed during the war. This tube allowed for a more compact rear projection system. The tube was mounted horizontally and directed toward a concave mirror as before, but this time the reflected image was turned through ninety degrees by a plane mirror with a central hole for the tube. It was then reflected upward through a Schmidt correcting lens before being reflected through a further ninety degrees to strike the screen. (Note: More information on the optical system can be found here)

This new tube and optical system offered several advantages over the previous system. The set cabinet was able to be smaller. Previously the screen was on top of a substantial piece of furniture but this new system allowed the screen to occupy a similar position as a direct-view television's screen in a regular console-sized cabinet. The Schmidt was still required to correct the image for spherical aberration from the mirror. (Note: This same technique was later used to correct the shape of the faulty mirror of the Hubble Space Telescope) The use of an additional plane mirror allowed the deflection coils and the focussing magnets to be positioned behind this mirror out of the light path. Previously they had partially obstructed the image from the concave mirror being somewhat larger than the tube's screen. The optical box that housed the tube was also designed to shield the X-radiation produced by the tube. The optical boxes were produced in three versions for 15 1/2-, 17 3/4- and 19 7/8-inch [diagonal] screens. Two further sizes were available for front projection onto 44- or 52-inch screens. The difference was solely the position of the tube's screen relative to the concave mirror and the optical characteristic of the Schmidt lens. This new system provided acceptable pictures that were bright enough when viewed in subdued lighting. However, the bright image in the tube's screen along with it still being driven hard meant that the tube's life was still substantially shorter than contemporary direct view tubes. A rear projection set would require at least one or two replacement tubes during its lifetime. This inconvenience was somewhat offset by the tube's relatively low price compared with the larger direct view versions, partly due to the quantities in which they had to be produced, plus the fact that they were fairly easy to replace.

As the 1950s unfolded, there were several major advances in cathode ray tube technology. Pre-stressing the bulb of the tube with steel bands around the outside of the screen for implosion protection allowed larger tube diameters to be produced. Improvements in correcting for deflection aberrations on those screens allowed larger deflection angles and consequently shorter tubes for a given screen size. Further: much simpler deflection systems had been developed that could generate the large currents required without consuming the power of earlier circuits. By 1956, the ability to produce near–rectangular-faced tubes was developed. This was facilitated by the pre-stressing, but still required the walls to have a convex shape to withstand the atmospheric pressure. Although 17 inches was the largest size at this time, it was large enough to render rear projection technology obsolete for the immediate future. Using the superior white phosphor of the post war period and higher accelerating voltages, (Note: By 1956, it had become the rule of thumb that the accelerating voltage was 1000 volts per inch of tube diameter or diagonal rounded to the nearest thousand. This was up from the 400 volts per inch of the 1930s and 1940s.) televisions were larger and brighter.

As television technology developed and picture quality improved, limitations in cathode ray tube sizes became an issue once again. Even though larger screen sizes with short tube lengths were available, there was a revival of interest in rear projection systems to achieve picture sizes that were beyond the capabilities of direct view cathode ray tubes of the time. Modern color rear-projection television had become commercially available in the 1970s, but at that time could not match the image sharpness of a direct-view CRT.

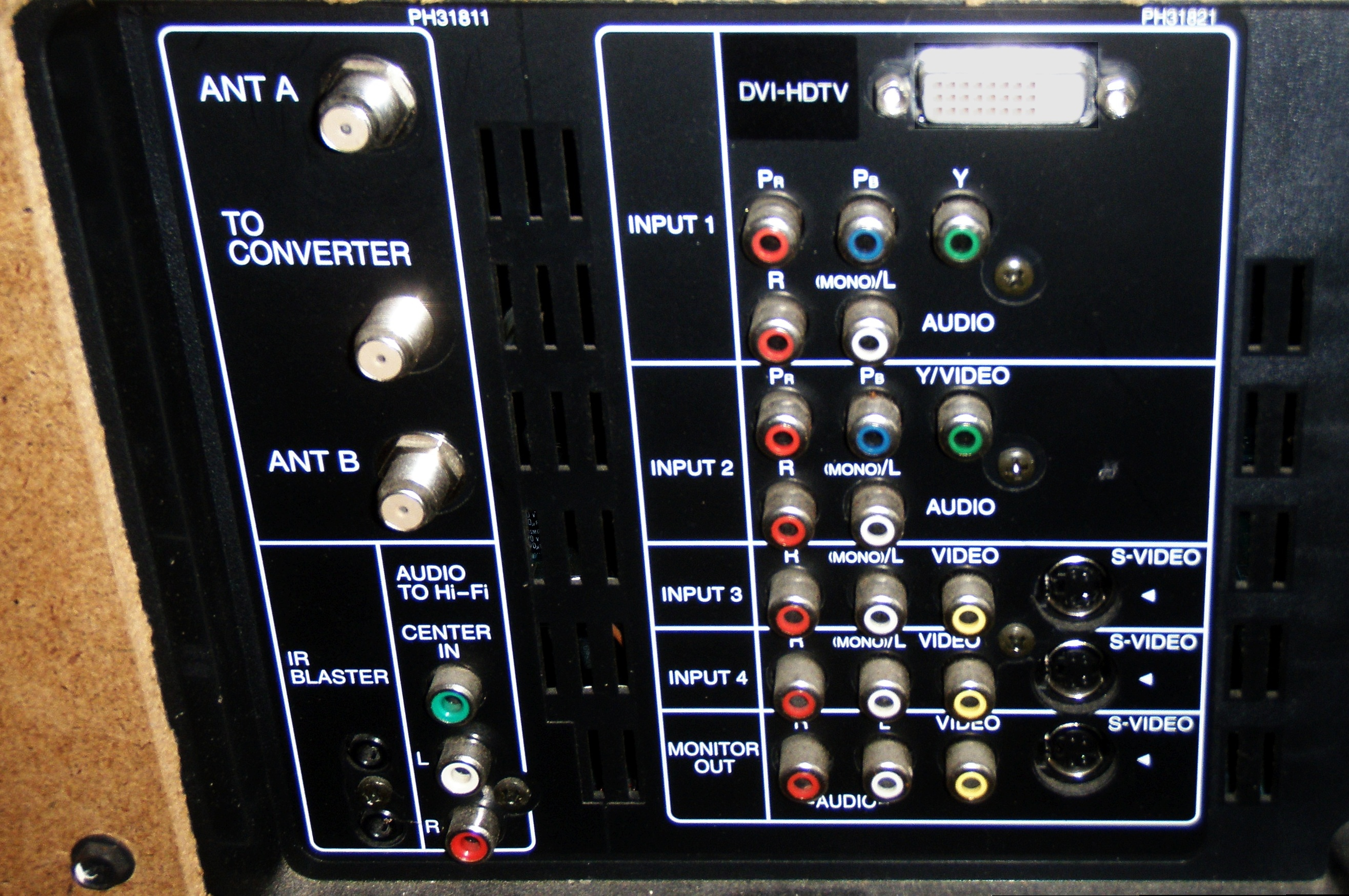
Early 2000s CRT projection TV with 1080i HD ready capabilities has an RCA line level input for use of internal speakers as a center channel in a surround sound system.

Given their already large dimensions, projection TVs sometimes included larger speakers and more powerful built-in audio vs direct view CRTs and especially depth-limited flat panels, as well as basic surround sound processing or emulators such as Sound Retrieval System (SRS) by SRS Labs, similar to a sound bar.

== Latest developments and decline in market ==
While popular in the early 2000s as an alternative to more expensive LCD and plasma flat panels despite increased bulk, the falling price and improvements to LCDs led to Sony, Philips, Toshiba and Hitachi dropping rear-projection TVs from their lineup. Samsung, Mitsubishi, ProScan, RCA, Panasonic and JVC exited the market later as LCD televisions became the standard. The bulk of earlier rear-projection TVs meant that they cannot be wall-mounted, and while most consumers of flat-panels do not hang up their sets, the ability to do so is considered a key selling point.

On June 6, 2007, Sony unveiled a 70" rear-projection SXRD model KDS-Z70XBR5 that was 40% slimmer than its predecessor and weighed 200 lbs, which was somewhat wall-mountable. However, on December 27, 2007, Sony decided to exit the RPTV market. Mitsubishi began offering their LaserVue line of wall mountable rear-projection TVs in 2009. Samsung exited the market by 2008, leaving Mitsubishi as the sole remaining manufacturer of RPTVs until it stopped in 2012 due to low profit margins and popularity.

== Types ==
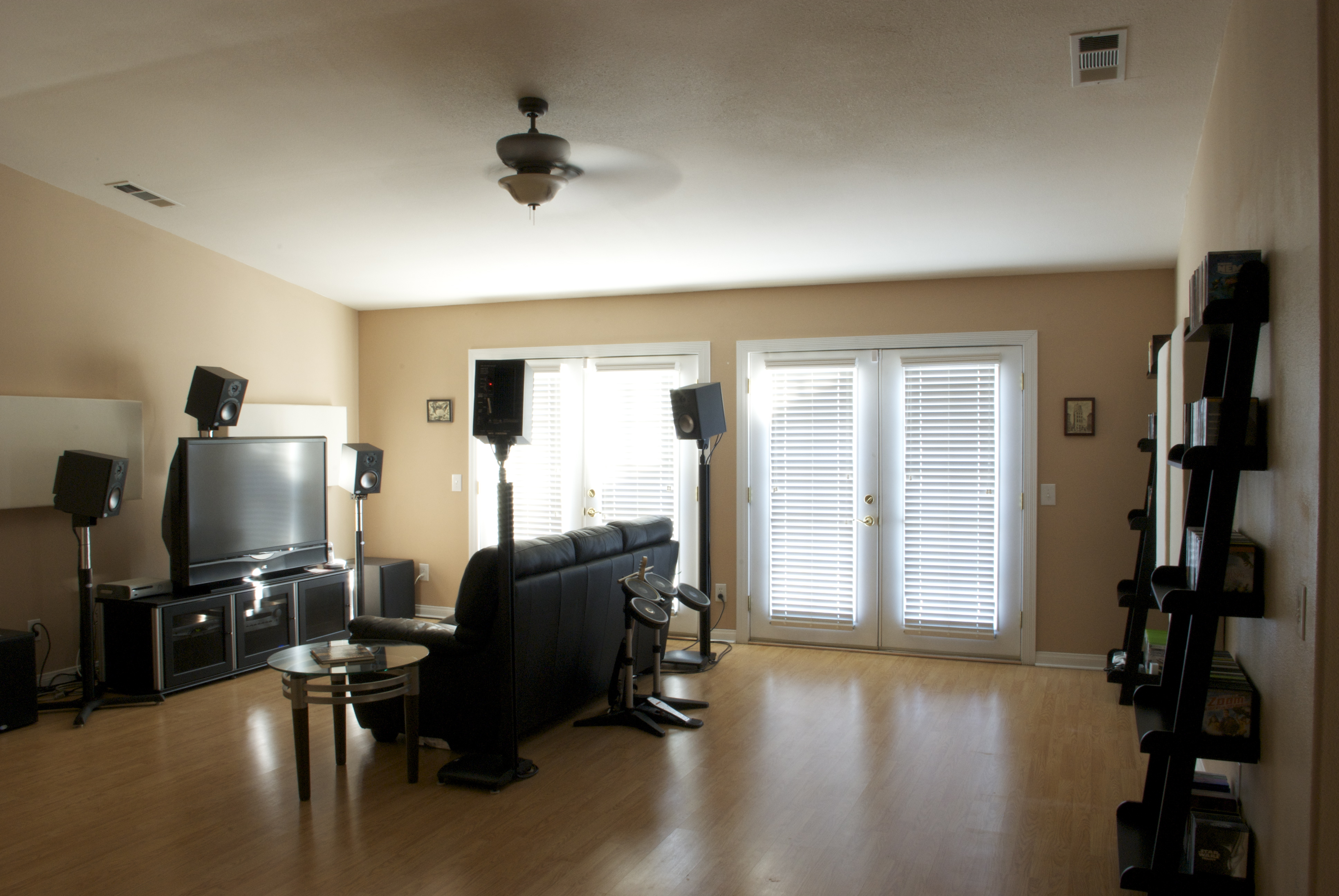
A thinner and lighter LCD or DLP projection TV in a home cinema.

Early RPTVs were essentially CRT projectors with a mirror to project onto a built-in screen. They were heavy, weighing up to 500 pounds. The first RPTVs to not use CRTs were launched in 2002, using DLP, LCD and LcOS technologies, requiring a UHP lamp. UHP lamps used in projectors and RPTVs require periodic replacement, as they dim with use. The first wall-mountable RPTV was launched in 2003 by RCA. The first DLP 1080p RPTV was launched in 2005 by Mitsubishi. The first RPTV to use LEDs instead of an UHP lamp as its light source was released by Samsung in 2006. RPTVs that used a plasma lamp were released by Panasonic in 2007. The first RPTV to use lasers instead of an UHP lamp or an LED was released by Mitsubishi as the LaserVue in 2008.

A projection television uses a projector to create a small image or video from a video signal and magnify this image onto a viewable screen. The projector uses a bright beam of light and a lens system to project the image to a much larger size. A front-projection television uses a projector that is separate from the screen and the projector is placed in front of the screen. The setup of a rear-projection television is in some ways similar to that of a traditional television. The projector is contained inside the television box and projects the image from behind the screen. The screen can be a fresnel lens.

The following are different types of projection televisions, which differ based on the type of projector and how the image (before projection) is created:

- CRT projector: Small cathode ray tubes create the image in the same manner that a traditional CRT television does, which is by firing a beam of electrons onto a phosphor-coated screen and then the image is projected to a large screen. This is done to overcome the limit of size of cathode ray tube which is about 40 inches. Normally 3 CRTs are used, one red, one green and one blue, aligned so the colors mix correctly on the projected image.
- LCD projector: A lamp transmits light through a small LCD chip made up of individual pixels to create an image. The LCD projector uses mirrors to take the light and create three separate red, green, and blue beams, which are then passed through three separate LCD panels. The liquid crystals are manipulated using electric current to control the amount of light passing through. The lens system takes the three color beams and projects the image.
- Digital Light Processing (DLP) projector: A DLP projector creates an image using a digital micromirror device (DMD chip), which on its surface contains a large matrix of microscopic mirrors, each corresponding to one pixel in an image. Each mirror can be rotated to reflect light such that the pixel appears bright, or the mirror can be rotated to direct light elsewhere and make the pixel appear dark. The mirror is made of aluminum and is rotated on an axle hinge. There are electrodes on both sides of the hinge controlling the rotation of the mirror using electrostatic attraction. The electrodes are connected to an SRAM cell located under each pixel, and charges from the SRAM cell drive the movement of the mirrors. Color is added to the image-creation process either through a spinning color wheel (used with a single-chip projector) or a three-chip (red, green, blue) projector. The color wheel is placed between the lamp light source and the DMD chip such that the light passing through is colored and then reflected off a mirror to determine the level of darkness. A color wheel consists of a red, green, and blue sector, as well as a fourth sector to either control brightness or include a fourth color. This spinning color wheel in the single-chip arrangement can be replaced by red, green, and blue light-emitting diodes (LED). The three-chip projector uses a prism to split up the light into three beams (red, green, blue), each directed towards its own DMD chip. The outputs of the three DMD chips are recombined and then projected.

== See also ==
- Silk screen effect
- Screen-door effect
- DLP
- Large-screen television technology
- Laser video display (LVD)
