= Forth Dimension Displays =

Forth Dimension Displays (ForthDD)
- Company type: Public
- Industry: Electronics
- Founded: 1998 (as Micropix); 2004 (as CRLO Displays Ltd); 2005 (as Forth Dimension Displays); 2011 (acquired by Kopin Corporation but remained as Forth Dimension Displays until 2024)
- Headquarters: Dalgety Bay, Fife, Scotland, United Kingdom
- Products: Microdisplays
- Revenue: ▲US$ 6 million (2010)
- Number of employees: 30 (2021)
- Website: www.kopin.com

Forth Dimension Displays (ForthDD) is a British optoelectronics company based in Dalgety Bay, Fife, United Kingdom. Since January 2024 the products have been integrated into the portfolio of its parent company Kopin as Kopin Europe.

== Company overview ==
Founded in 1998 as Micropix and known later as CRL Opto and CRLO Displays, ForthDD makes high resolution microdisplays and spatial light modulators (SLM). The microdisplays are used in near-to-eye (NTE) applications for the military training and simulation, medical imagery, virtual reality and high definition image processing industries. The SLMs are used for structured light projection in 3D optical metrology and 3D super resolution microscopy. Previously funded by venture capitalists, in January 2011 ForthDD was acquired by Kopin Corporation, a NASDAQ listed company based in Westborough, Massachusetts, USA.

== Technology ==
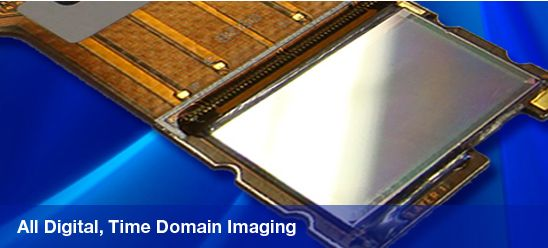
Microdisplay

ForthDD's microdisplays and SLMs are based on a proprietary, high-speed, reflective ferroelectric liquid crystal on silicon (LCOS) platform, protected by a number of patents. For the generation of colour and greyscale, the microdisplays use a process called Time Domain Imaging (TDI™). This process involves rendering the red, green and blue colour components which make up an image sequentially over time at high speed. This happens so fast that the human visual system integrates the components into a single, full colour image. This enables the microdisplays to use the same pixel mirror for all three colour components, and avoids the artifacts associated with sub-pixels.

LCOS Technology History

The first LCOS device originated in 1973, followed by a development of a liquid-crystal light valve ten years later. It was not until 1993, that a microdisplay with a resolution sufficient for use as a display was reported by DisplayTech (now Citizen Finedevices). It was capable of full red–green–blue image generation, enabled by the use of a fast-switching ferroelectric liquid crystal.

During the early part of the 21st century, many microdisplay manufacturers focused on applying the technology to rear-projection-based high-definition television (HDTV) systems. However, due to developments in the manufacturing process of large-panel Liquid Crystal Display Televisions (LCD TVs) and resulting drops in the cost of components, LCD based TVs matured into the more popular consumer choice. By late 2007 almost all microdisplay Rear Projection Television (RPTV) manufacturers had withdrawn their TVs from production.

As a result, a number of microdisplay manufacturers either disappeared completely or started working on other technologies. Some companies diversified, whilst others concentrated on a niche market instead.

== Products ==
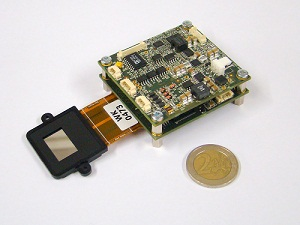
WXGA-R5 compared to €2 coin

ForthDD/Kopin is a supplier of microdisplays for Near-To-Eye (NTE) applications and spatial light modulators for fringe projection systems.

The product portfolio comprises full colour, all digital WQHD (2560 x 1440 pixels), 2K (2048 x 2048 pixels), QXGA (2048 × 1536), SXGA (1280 × 1024) and WXGA (1280 × 768) microdisplays. These products are available as chipsets and board level based products.

== Applications ==
ForthDD's/Kopin's microdisplays are typically used in the following application areas: Training and Virtual Environments, Medical Systems and 3D Optical Metrology. Later system developments have allowed expansion into markets using phase modulation, Super-resolution microscopy.

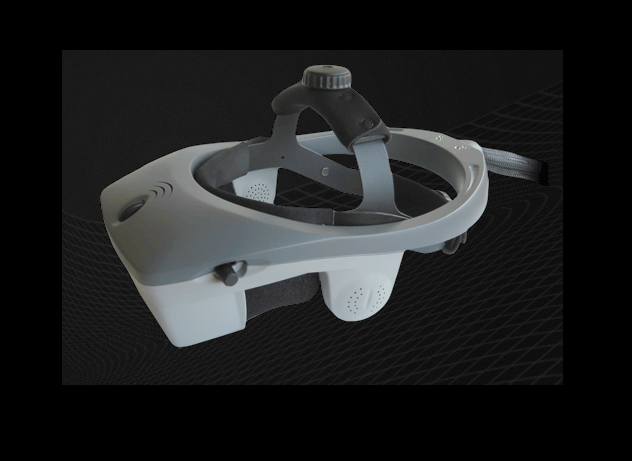
NVIS nVISOR SX60

Training and Virtual Environments

ForthDD's/Kopin's microdisplays can be found in various training and simulation applications across military and civilian environments within devices such as virtual binoculars, monocular viewers and most commonly, immersive HMDs (for example, in NVIS HMDs). By using HMDs to immerse the user in the virtual 3D environment, different scenarios, which may be too dangerous or expensive to replicate in the real world, can be explored.

3D Optical Metrology

ForthDD's/Kopin's microdisplays are used for fast fringe projection quality inspection systems like 3D Automated Optical Inspection and 3D Solder Paste Inspection placed in-line surface mount production lines.

Medical systems

Microdisplays can be used in high-end medical/surgical microscopes in order to either replace the optical image or overlay data on the image (e.g. an MRI scan). When combined with a microdisplay the microscope becomes a more powerful tool and permits users to navigate the desired surface in real time with a very high degree of accuracy.

Film and Television

The microdisplays are used in Electronic Viewfinders (EVFs) for HD digital cinema cameras. ARRI used ForthDD's technology in its EVF1.
