= Mr. Meeble =

- Origin: Phoenix, Arizona, United States
- Genres: Electronic, electronic rock, trip hop, post-rock
- Years active: 2005–2018
- Labels: Absolute Motion
- Members: Devin Fleenor, Michael Plaster, Rick Heins, Blain Klitzke
- Website: meeble.com (defunct)

Mr. Meeble was an electronic rock band from Phoenix, Arizona, formed in late 2005 by Devin Fleenor and Michael Plaster. The band grew its fan base primarily via websites such as YouTube, and continued to self-release music and videos on its label, Absolute Motion. They were regarded for their visually elaborated live shows, combining video projections, RGB lasers and other custom-made visual devices to enhance the mix of electronics and live instrumentation. A writer for Wired described their sound as "coded into the musical matrix somewhere between Depeche Mode and Massive Attack". Another journalist wrote that "Mr. Meeble's sound falls somewhere between Radiohead and Stereolab". In their biography, the band names Thom Yorke and Air as influences.

== Touring ==
In the fall of 2011, Mr. Meeble set off on a tour of 11 European countries. The tour was booked and organized by Devin Fleenor and included the following dates/venues:

- 03/09/11: Berlin, Germany – Session Café
- 06/09/11: Poznan, Poland – Blue Note
- 08/09/11: Warsaw, Poland – Klub Fabryka Kotłów
- 09/09/11: Wroclaw, Poland – Klub Muzyczny Liverpool
- 10/09/11: Prague, Czech – Club Kaštan
- 13/09/11: Cluj-Napoca, Romania – Flying Circus Pub
- 15/09/11: Bucharest, Romania – The Silver Church Club
- 17/09/11: Timișoara, Romania – Setup Club
- 18/09/11: Novi Sad, Serbia – CK13
- 19/09/11: Budapest, Hungary – Tündérgyár
- 22/09/11: Vienna, Austria – B72
- 24/09/11: Geneva, Switzerland – Le Cabinet
- 25/09/11: Geneva, Switzerland – KAB | Usine
- 01/10/11: Barcelona, Spain – Puerto Hurrako Sisters Bar
- 04/10/11: Madrid, Spain – Sala Bar&Co
- 07/10/11: Murcia, Spain – Sala Musik
- 10/10/11: Porto, Portugal – Hard Club
- 13/10/11: Frankfurt, Germany – Das Bett
- 20/10/11: London, UK – The Dublin Castle

== Discography ==
=== Albums ===
- Never Trust the Chinese (2008, CD & digital Absolute Motion (USA))
- Never Trust the Chinese (Limited) (2009, digital Absolute Motion (USA))

=== EPs ===
- Non Assault Message Medium Enjoyment Maxi Single (2007, CD & digital Absolute Motion (USA))
- Nostalgic for Now (2012, CD & digital Absolute Motion (USA))

=== Video/DVDs ===
- Smoke & Mirrors (2010, DVD Absolute Motion (USA))

== Disbanding ==
As Devin Fleenor mentioned in a tweet, he suffered from bronchiectasis, a chronic disease that affects the lungs and worsens over time. On March 29, 2018, he passed due to complications from this disease. Mr. Meeble disbanded right after.
