= Visual artifact =

Anomaly in digital graphics or imagery

A screenshot of a Microsoft Windows XP application displaying a visual artifact with repeated frames

Visual artifacts (also artefacts) are anomalies apparent during visual representation as in digital graphics and other forms of imagery, especially photography and microscopy.

== In digital graphics ==
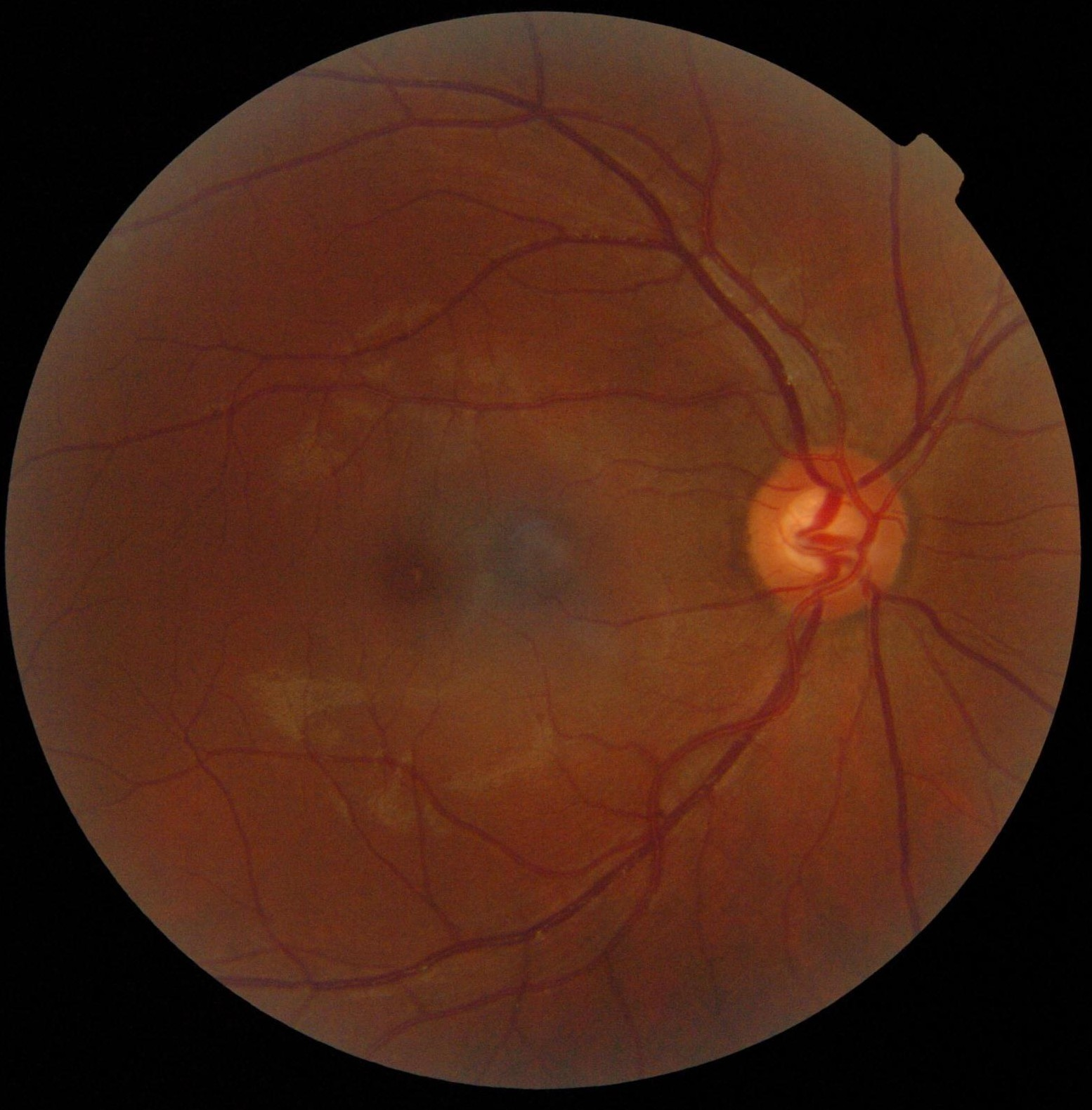
A retinography. The gray spot in the center is a shadow artifact.

- Image quality factors, different types of visual artifacts
- Compression artifacts
- Digital artifacts, visual artifacts resulting from digital image processing
- Noise
- Screen-door effect, also known as fixed-pattern noise (FPN), a visual artifact of digital projection technology
- Ghosting (television)
- Screen burn-in
- Distortion
- Silk screen effect
- Rainbow effect
- Screen tearing
- Moiré pattern
- Color banding

== In video entertainment ==
Many people who use their computers as a hobby experience artifacting due to a hardware or software malfunction. The cases can differ but the usual causes are:

- Temperature issues, such as failure of cooling fan.
- Unsuited video card (graphics card) drivers.
- Drivers that have values that the graphics card is not suited with.
- Overclocking beyond the capabilities of the particular video card.
- Software bugs in the application or operating system.

The differing cases of visual artifacting can also differ between scheduled task(s).

== In photography ==
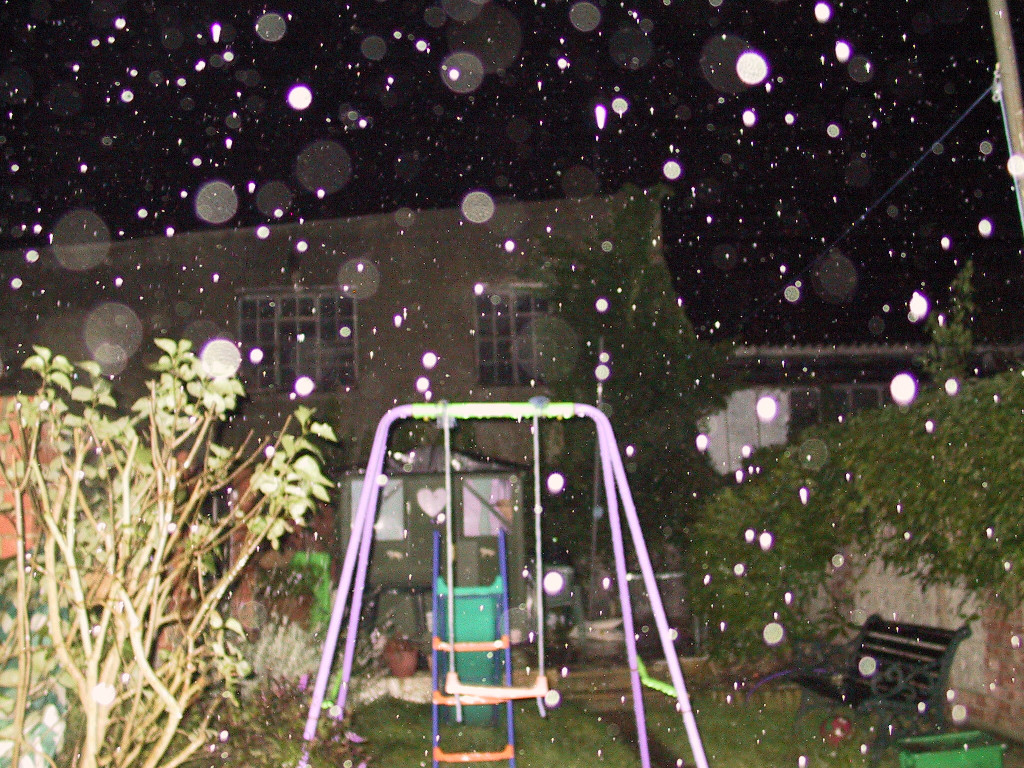
Circular artifacts caused by backscatter from raindrops

These effects can occur in both analog and digital photography.

- Chromatic aberration due to optical dispersion through a lens, leading to color fringes at high-contrast boundaries in a photograph
  - Purple fringing
- Motion blur
- Near-camera reflection, visual artifacts caused by the backscatter of light by unfocused particles

== In microscopy ==
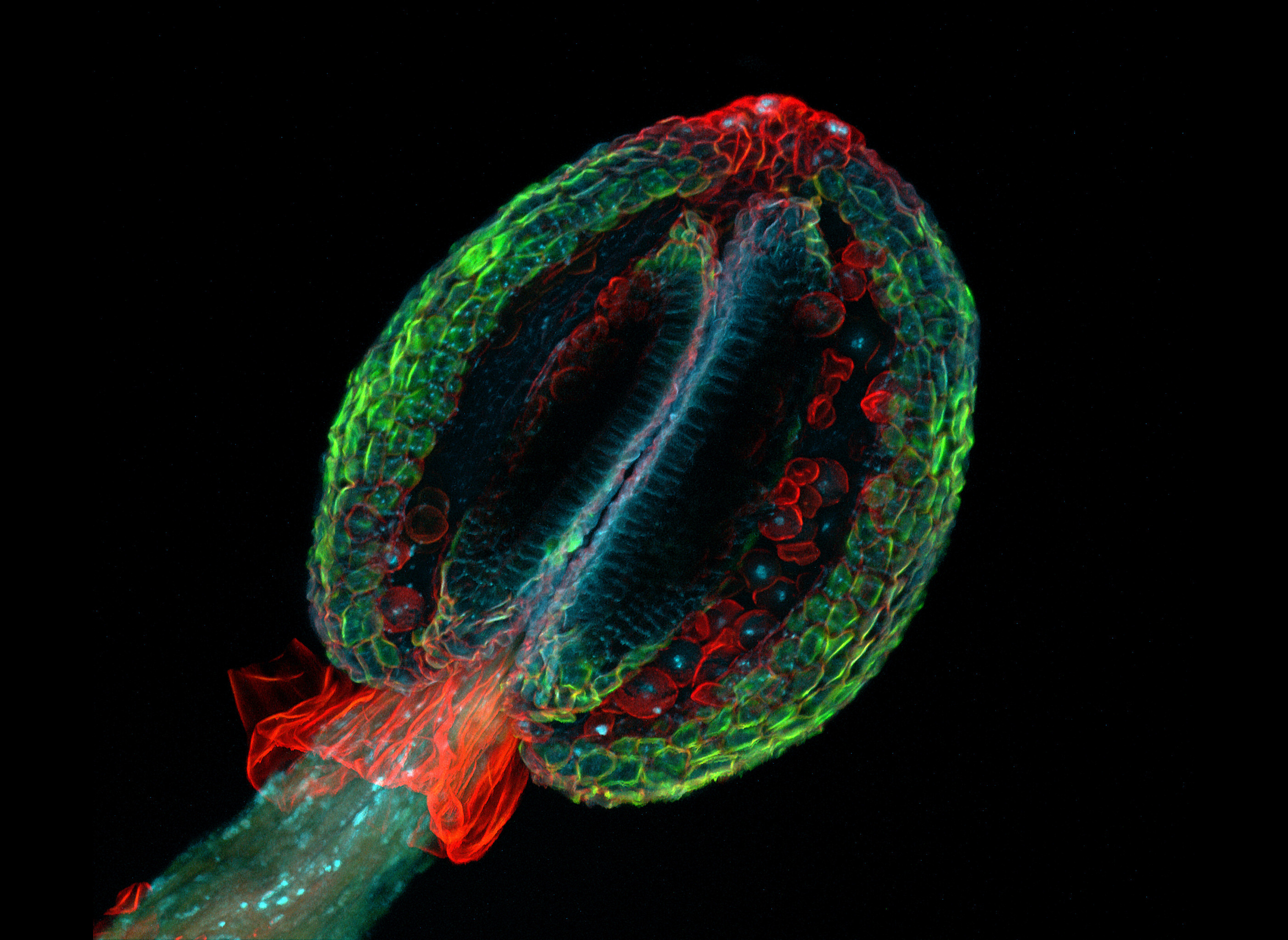
Confocal laser scanning fluorescence micrograph of thale cress anther (part of stamen). The picture shows among other things a nice red flowing collar-like structure just below the anther. However, an intact thale cress stamen does not have such collar, this is a fixation artifact: the stamen has been cut below the picture frame, and epidermis (upper layer of cells) of stamen stalk has peeled off, forming a non-characteristic structure. Photo: Heiti Paves from Tallinn University of Technology.

In microscopy, an artifact is an apparent structural detail that is caused by the processing of the specimen and is thus not a legitimate feature of the specimen. In light microscopy, artifacts may be produced by air bubbles trapped under the slide's cover slip.

In electron microscopy, distortions may be produced in the drying out of the specimen. Staining can cause the appearance of solid chemical deposits that may be seen as structures inside the cell. Different techniques including freeze-fracturing and cell fractionation may be used to overcome the problems of artifacts.

A crush artifact is an artificial elongation and distortion seen in histopathology and cytopathology studies, presumably because of iatrogenic compression of tissues. Distortion can be caused by the slightest compression of tissue and can provide difficulties in diagnosis. It may cause chromatin to be squeezed out of nuclei. Inflammatory and tumor cells are most susceptible to crush artifacts.

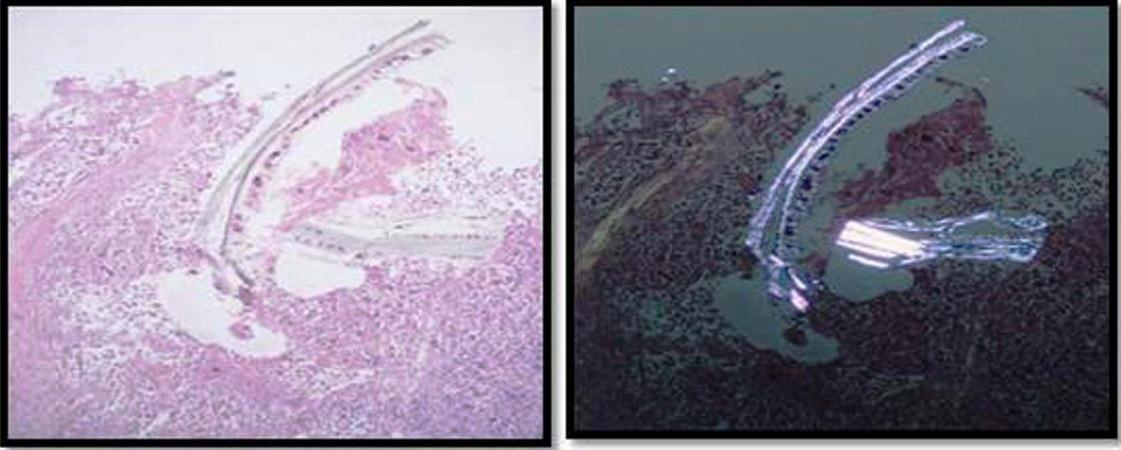
Cellulose contamination, in H&E stain and polarized light

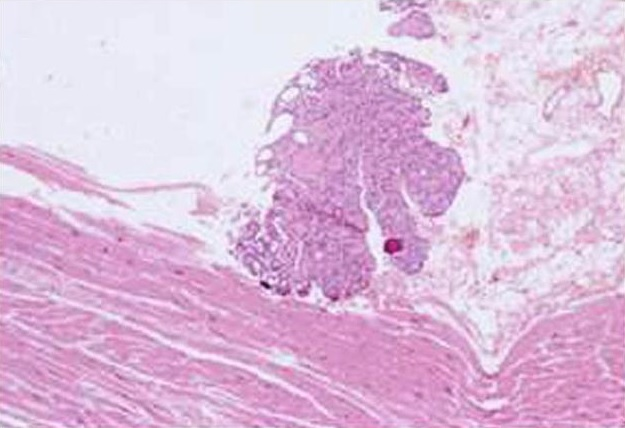
Cardiac muscle (bottom) with contamination from thyroid tissue (center)

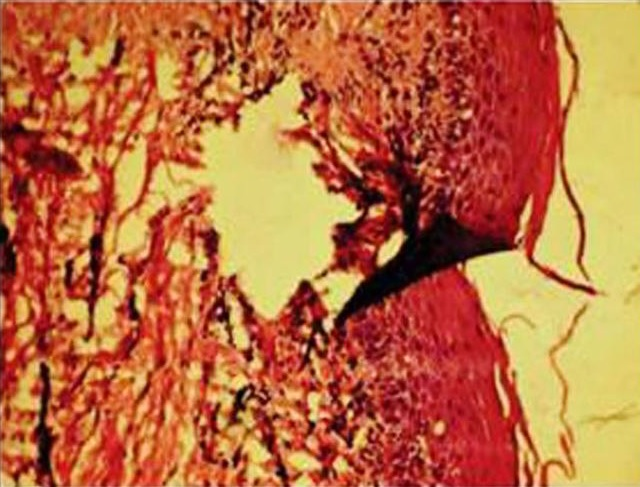
Crush artifact from compression by forceps on the tissue sample

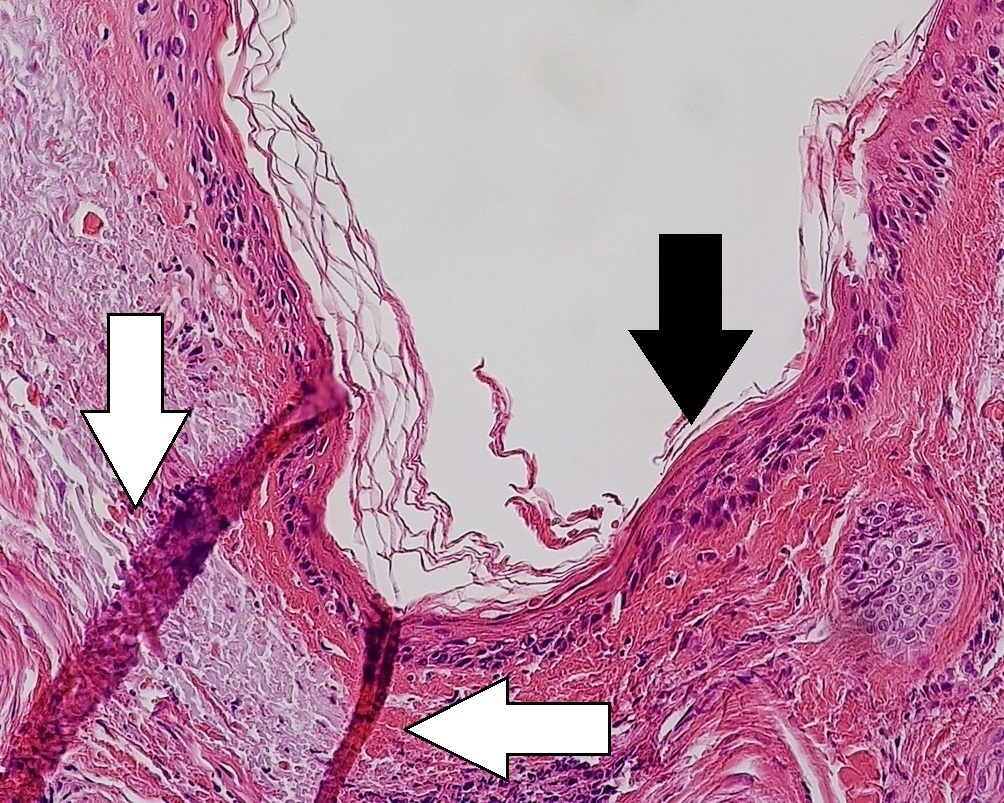
Folding artifacts (white arrows) and a crush artifact (black arrow, with cytoplasmic hypereosinophilia and nuclear pleomorphism) from a needle

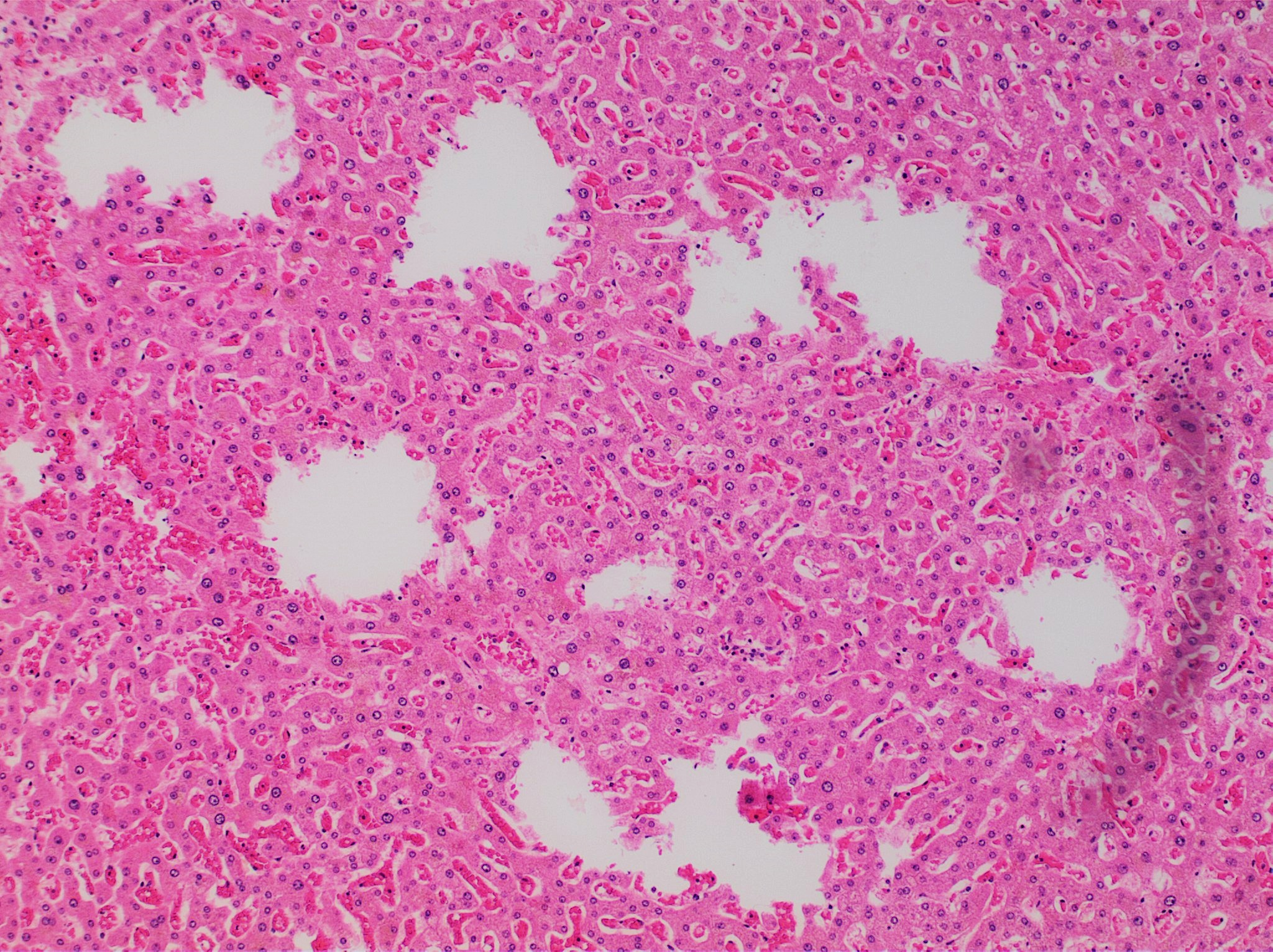
Tearing artifacts, such as can be caused by:
- Microtomy with a nick or blemish in the knife edge.
- Traction of the sections.
- Too much or too little alcohol dehydration.
- Sectioning calcified parts, which can be decalcified or removed.

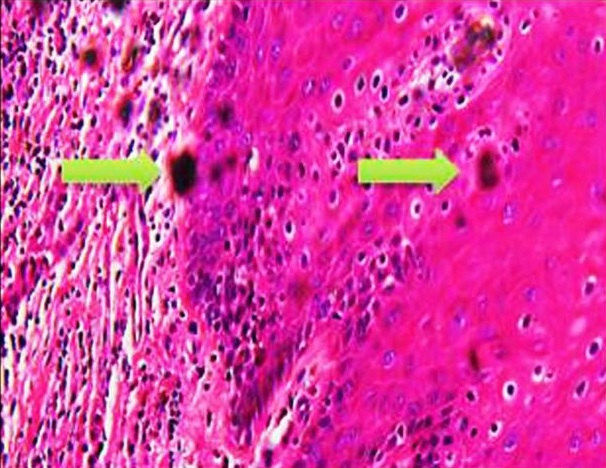
Formalin pigment artifacts

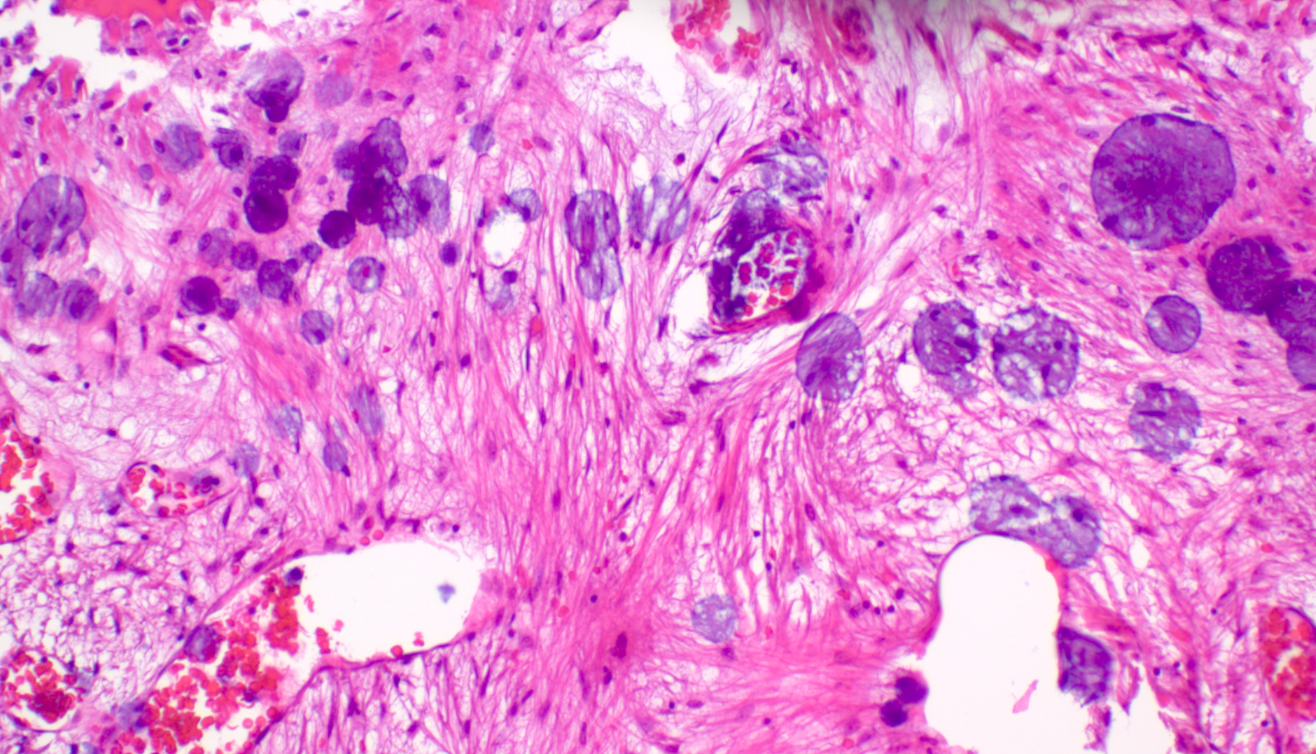
Air bubble entrapment artifact in a shoulder joint biopsy

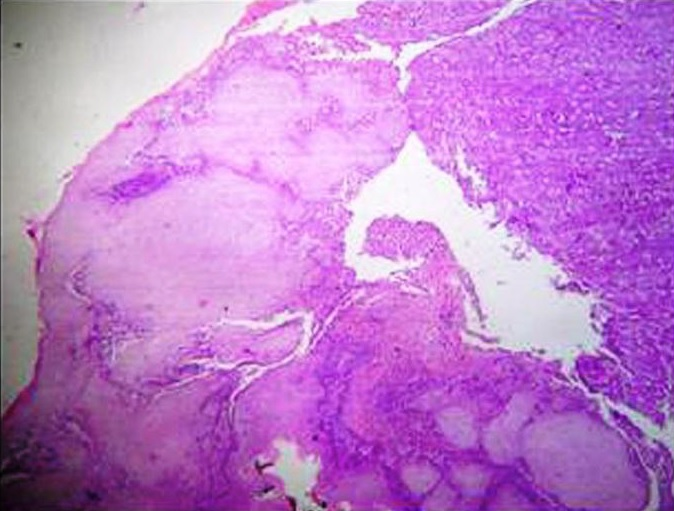
Staining artifacts by residual wax, resulting in pale areas where cellular structures are not discernible

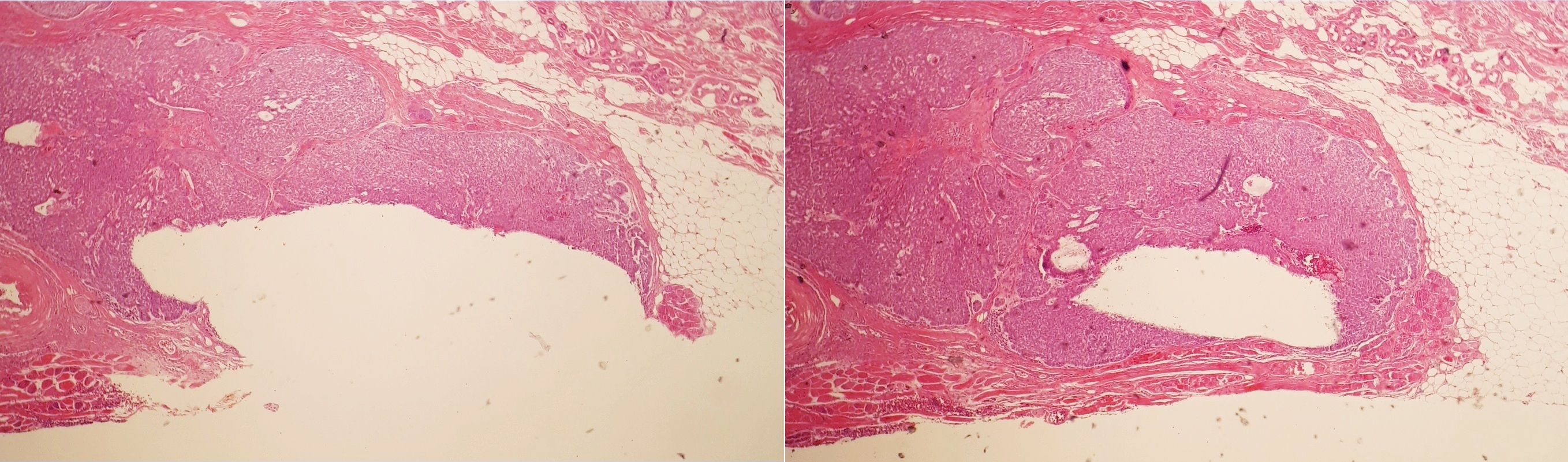
A separation artifact in top image makes the tumor look incompletely excised, but the next microtomy level (bottom image) shows a surgical margin of connective tissue.

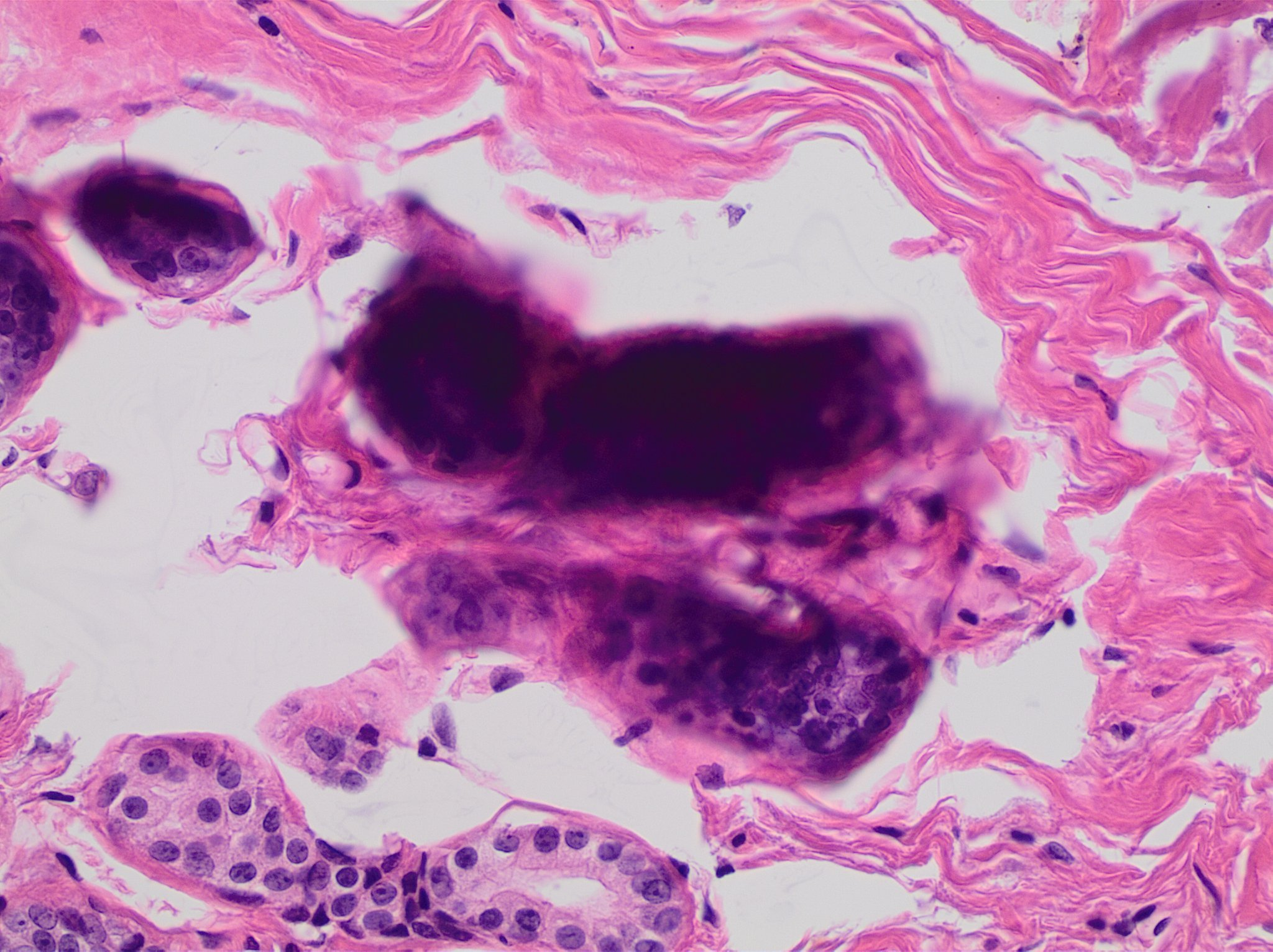
Stacking of cells on top of each other gives a dark look, and in this breast tissue it may mimic microcalcifications.

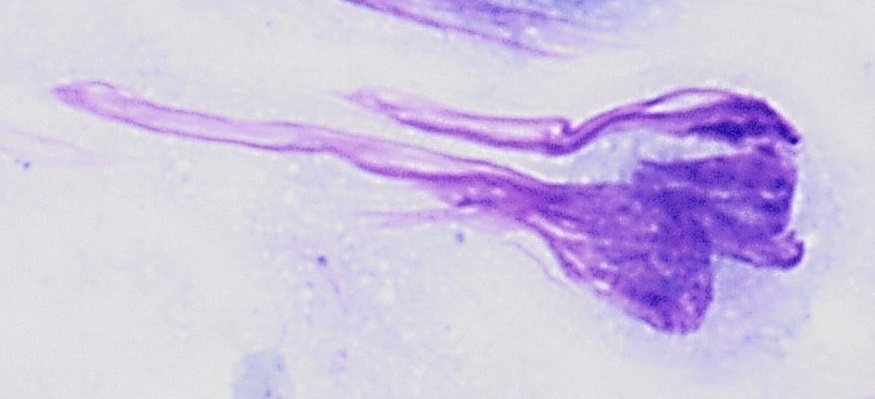
Pap stained smear of a monocyte with nuclear smearing or smudging artifact, seen as a tail-like extension of nuclear material

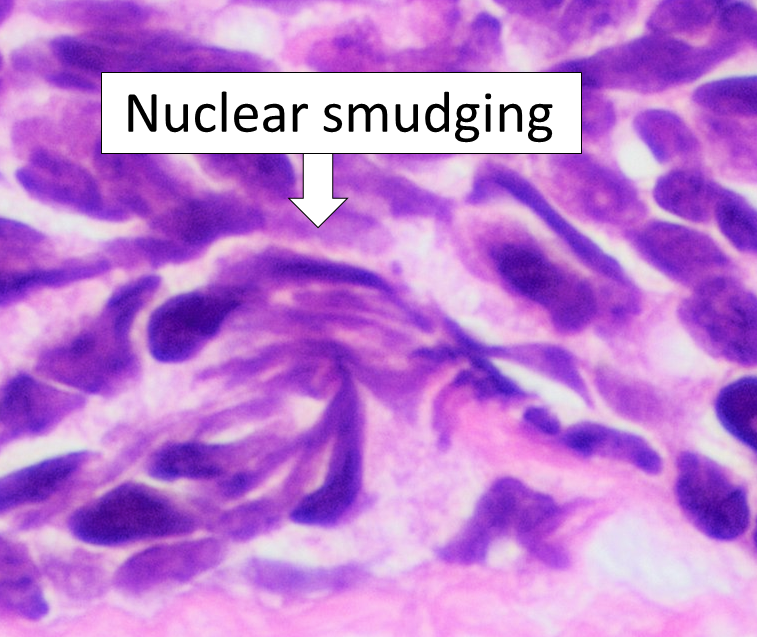
Small cell carcinoma is a cancer where the presence of smudging is a clue to the diagnosis.

== In radiography ==
In projectional radiography, visual artifacts that can constitute disease mimics include jewelry, clothes and skin folds.

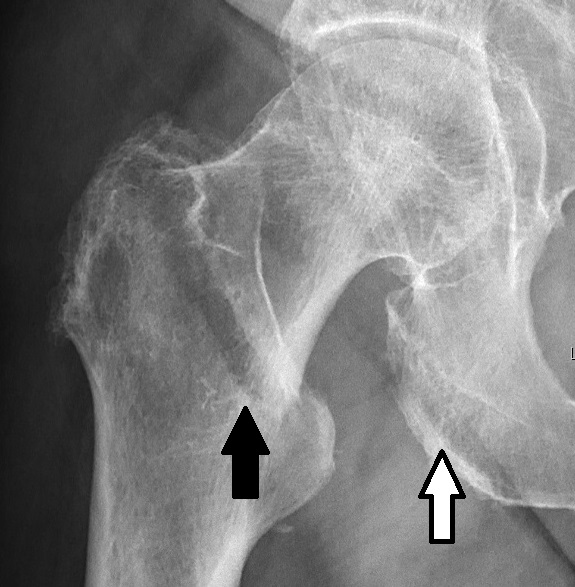
A hip fracture (black arrow) next to a skin fold (white arrow)

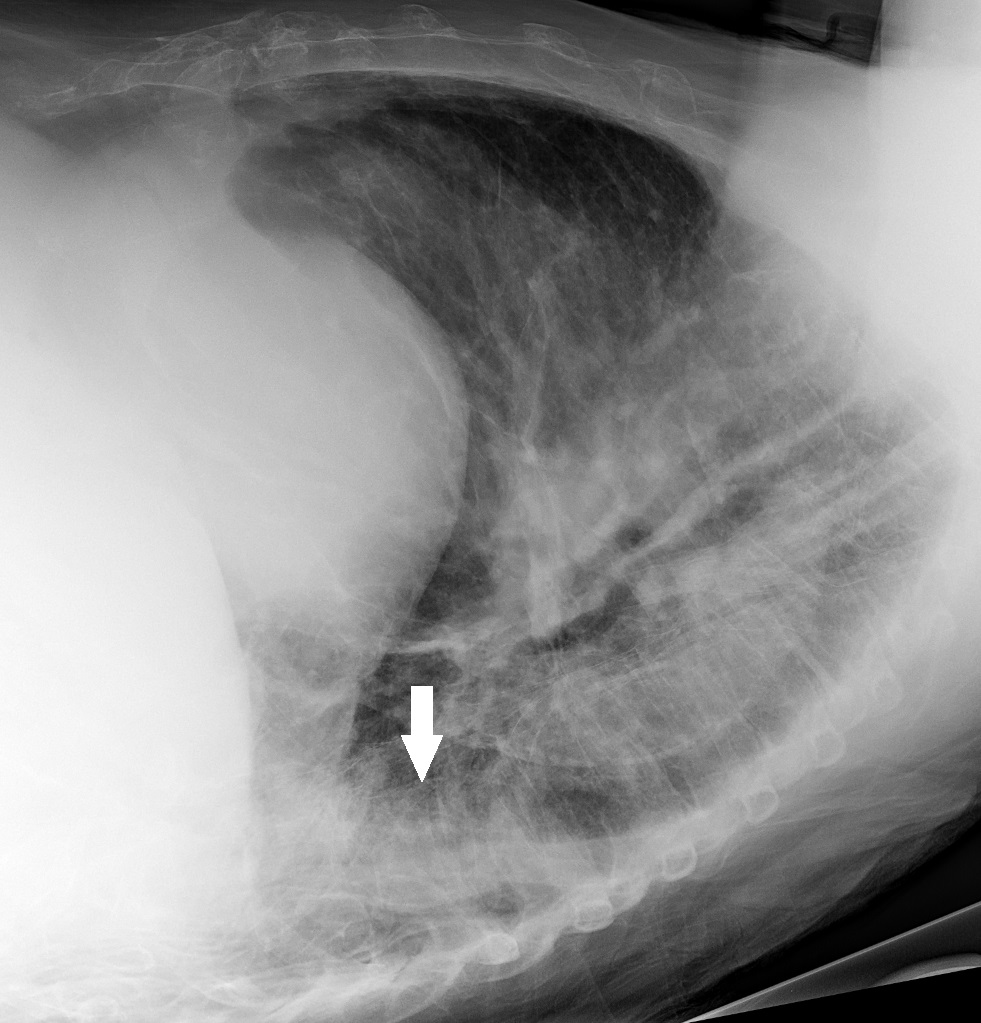
Bed sheets looking like lung opacities on a chest radiograph

== In magnetic resonance imaging ==
In Magnetic resonance imaging, artifacts can be classified as patient-related, signal processing-dependent or hardware (machine)-related.
