= Wavelength selective switching =

Components used for routing signals between optical fibres on a per-wavelength basis

Wavelength selective switching components are used in WDM optical communications networks to route (switch) signals between optical fibres on a per-wavelength basis.

== What is a WSS ==
A WSS comprises a switching array that operates on light that has been dispersed in wavelength without the requirement that the dispersed light be physically demultiplexed into separate ports. This is termed a ‘disperse and switch’ configuration. For example, an 88 channel WDM system can be routed from a “common” fiber to any one of N fibers by employing 88 1 x N switches. This represents a significant simplification of a demux and switch and multiplex architecture that would require (in addition to N +1 mux/demux elements) a non-blocking switch for 88 N x N channels which would test severely the manufacturability limits of large-scale optical cross-connects for even moderate fiber counts.

A more practical approach, and one adopted by the majority of WSS manufacturers is shown schematically in Figure 1 (to be uploaded). The various incoming channels of a common port are dispersed continuously onto a switching element which then directs and attenuates each of these channels independently to the N switch ports. The dispersive mechanism is generally based on holographic or ruled diffraction gratings similar to those used commonly in spectrometers. It can be advantageous, for achieving resolution and coupling efficiency, to employ a combination of a reflective or transmissive grating and a prism – known as a GRISM. The operation of the WSS can be bidirectional so the wavelengths can be multiplexed together from different ports onto a single common port. To date, the majority of deployments have used a fixed channel bandwidth of 50 or 100 GHz and 9 output ports are typically used.

== Microelectromechanical Mirrors (MEMS) ==
The simplest and earliest commercial WSS were based on movable mirrors using Micro-Electro-Mechanical Systems (MEMS). The incoming light is broken into a spectrum by a diffraction grating (shown at RHS of Figure) and each wavelength channel then focuses on a separate MEMS mirror. By tilting the mirror in one dimension, the channel can be directed back into any of the fibers in the array. A second tilting axis allows transient crosstalk to be minimized, otherwise switching (eg) from port 1 to port 3 will always involve passing the beam across port 2. The second axis provides a means to attenuate the signal without increasing the coupling into neighboring fibers. This technology has the advantage of a single steering surface, not necessarily requiring polarization diversity optics. It works well in the presence of a continuous signal, allowing the mirror tracking circuits to dither the mirror and maximise coupling.

MEMS based WSS typically produce good extinction ratios, but poor open loop performance for setting a given attenuation level. The main limitations of the technology arise from the channelization that the mirrors naturally enforce. During manufacturing, the channels must be carefully aligned with the mirrors, complicating the manufacturing process. Post-manufacturing alignment adjustments have been mainly limited to adjusting the gas pressure within the hermetic enclosure. This enforced channelization has also proved, so far, an insurmountable obstacle to implementing flexible channel plans where different channel sizes are required within a network. Additionally the phase of light at the mirror edge is not well controlled in a physical mirror so artefacts can arise in the switching of light near the channel edge due to interference of the light from each channel.

== Binary Liquid Crystal (LC) ==
Liquid crystal switching avoids both the high cost of small volume MEMS fabrication and potentially some of its fixed channel limitations. The concept is illustrated in Figure 3 (to be uploaded). A diffraction grating breaks the incoming light into a spectrum. A software controlled binary liquid crystal stack, individually tilts each optical channel and a second grating (or a second pass of the first grating) is used to spectrally recombine the beams. The offsets created by the liquid crystal stack cause the resulting spectrally recombined beams to be spatially offset, and hence to focus, through a lens array, into separate fibers. Polarization diversity optics ensures low Polarization Dependent Losses (PDL).

This technology has the advantages of relatively low cost parts, simple electronic control and stable beam positions without active feedback. It is capable of configuring to a flexible grid spectrum by the use of a fine pixel grid. The inter-pixel gaps must be small compared to the beam size, to avoid perturbing the transmitted light significantly. Furthermore, each grid must be replicated for each of the switching stages creating the requirement of individually controlling thousands of pixels on different substrates so the advantages of this technology in terms of simplicity are negated as the wavelength resolution becomes finer.

The main disadvantage of this technology arises from the thickness of the stacked switching elements. Keeping the optical beam tightly focused over this depth is difficult and has, so far, limited the ability of high port count WSS to achieve very fine (12.5 GHz or less) granularity.

== Liquid Crystal on Silicon (LCoS) ==
Liquid Crystal on Silicon LCoS is particularly attractive as a switching mechanism in a WSS because of the near continuous addressing capability, enabling much new functionality. In particular the bands of wavelengths which are switched together (channels) need not be preconfigured in the optical hardware but can be programmed into the switch through the software control. Additionally, it is possible to take advantage of this ability to reconfigure channels while the device is operating. A schematic of an LCoS WSS is shown in Figure 4 (to be uploaded).

LCoS technology has enabled the introduction of more flexible wavelength grids which help to unlock the full spectral capacity of optical fibers. Even more surprising features rely on the phase matrix nature of the LCoS switching element. Features in common use include such things as shaping the power levels within a channel or broadcasting the optical signal to more than one port.

LCoS-based WSS also permit dynamic control of channel centre frequency and bandwidth through on-the-fly modification of the pixel arrays via embedded software. The degree of control of channel parameters can be very fine-grained, with independent control of the centre frequency and either upper- or lower-band-edge of a channel with better than 1 GHz resolution possible. This is advantageous from a manufacturability perspective, with different channel plans being able to be created from a single platform and even different operating bands (such as C and L) being able to use an identical switch matrix. Products have been introduced allowing switching between 50 GHz channels and 100 GHz channels, or a mix of channels, without introducing any errors or “hits” to the existing traffic. More recently, this has been extended to support the whole concept of Flexible or Elastic networks under ITU G.654.2 through products such as Finisar's Flexgrid™ WSS.

For more detailed information on the applications of LCoS in telecommunications and, in particular, Wavelength Selective Switches, see chapter 16 in Optical Fiber Telecommunications VIA, edited by Kaminov, Li and Wilner, Academic Press ISBN 978-0-12-396958-3.

== MEMS Arrays ==
A further array-based switch engine uses an array of individual reflective MEMS mirrors to perform the necessary beam steering (Figure 5 (to be uploaded). These arrays are typically a derivative of the Texas Instruments DLP range of spatial light modulators. In this case, the angle of the MEMs mirrors is changed to deflect the beam. However, current implementations only allow the mirrors to have two possible states, giving two potential beam angles. This complicates the design of multi-port WSS and has limited their application to relatively low-port-count devices.

== Future Developments ==
=== Dual WSS ===
It is likely that in future two WSS could use the same optical module utilizing different wavelength processing regions of a single matrix switch such as LCoS, provided that the issues associated with device isolation are able to be appropriately addressed. Channel selectivity ensures only wavelengths required to be dropped locally (up to the maximum number of transceivers in the bank) are presented to any mux/demux module through each fiber, which in turn reduces the filtering and extinction requirements on the mux/demux module.

=== Contentionless WSS ===
This provides cost and performance benefits for next generation colorless, directionless, contentionless (CDC) reconfigurable optical add-drop multiplexer (ROADM) networks, resulting from improved scalability of add/drop ports and removal of erbium-doped fiber amplifier (EDFA) arrays (which are required to overcome splitting losses in multicast switches).

=== Advanced Spatial Light Modulators ===
The technical maturity of spatial light modulators based on consumer driven applications has been highly advantageous to their adoption in the telecommunications arena. There are developments in MEMs phased arrays and other electro-optic spatial light modulators that could be envisaged in the future to be applicable to telecom switching and wavelength processing, perhaps bringing faster switching or having an advantage in simplicity of optical design through polarisation-independent operation. For example, the design principles developed for LCoS could be applied to other phase-controllable arrays in a straightforward fashion if a suitable phase stroke (greater than 2π at 1550 nm) can be achieved. However the requirements for low electrical crosstalk and high fill factor over very small pixels required to allow switching in a compact form factor remain serious practical impediments to achieving these goals.
