= Kopin Corporation =

American electronics manufacturer

- Traded as: Nasdaq: KOPN
- Headquarters: Westborough, United States
- Website: kopin.com

The Kopin Corporation (Nasdaq: KOPN) is a Westborough, Massachusetts-based electronics manufacturer, best known for its microdisplay devices and application specific optical solutions for defense, enterprise, medical and consumer mobile electronics.

== Microdisplays ==
Founder and former Chairman, President and CEO John C.C. Fan describes the company's growth strategy as being based on expanding the range of applications for microdisplays.

Kopin's first CyberDisplay product debuted in 1999 in a JVC digital camera; it featured a 320x240 pixel display with a 0.24 inches (0.61 cm) diagonal measurement. In 2007, the Olympus Corporation chose a Kopin CyberDisplay with QVGA-level resolution for inclusion as a viewfinder in its SP-550 UZ model. In 2012, the company's newest CyberDisplay model had a diagonal measurement of 0.27 inches (0.69 cm) with VGA-level resolution of 640x480 pixels.

Outside of the consumer market, Kopin's microdisplays have also been used in electronics devices aimed at the military and law enforcement officers. In 2008, the United States Army awarded Kopin with the first phase of a $4.2 million program aimed at producing microdisplays more quickly and improving their performance, with the aim of incorporating them in night vision devices.

== Other products ==
Kopin also previously manufactured heterojunction bipolar transistors.

== Acquisitions ==
In January 2011, Kopin acquired British optoelectronics company Forth Dimension Displays (FDD) for £7 million in cash. Kopin's former president John Fan indicated in media comments that Kopin was especially interested in FDD's ultra-high resolution reflective microdisplays and time domain imaging technology.

== Controversy ==
In July 1999, Neil Bush, (son to President George H. W. Bush and brother to President George W. Bush) made at least $798,000 on three stock trades in a single day of Kopin Corp. where he had been employed as a consultant. The company announced on the same day good news about a new Asian client that sent its stock value soaring. Bush stated that he had no inside knowledge and that his financial advisor had recommended the trades. He said, "any increase in the price of the stock on that day was purely coincidental, meaning that I did not have any improper information." When asked in January 2004 about the stock trades, Bush contrasted the capital gains he reported in 1999 and 2000 with the capital losses on Kopin stock he reported ($287,722 in all) in 2001. In 2001 Kopin joined a broad decline in high-tech stock valuations.
