= Laser TV =

Type of television

Laser color television (laser TV), or laser color video display, is a type of television that utilizes one or more individually modulated optical (laser) rays of different colors to produce a combined spot that is scanned and projected across the image plane by a polygon-mirror system or less effectively by optoelectronic means to produce a color-television display. The systems work either by scanning the entire picture a dot at a time and modulating the laser directly at high frequency, much like the electron beams in a cathode ray tube, or by optically spreading and then modulating the laser and scanning a line at a time, the line itself being modulated in much the same way as with digital light processing (DLP).

The special case of one ray reduces the system to a monochrome display as, for example, in black and white television. This principle applies to a direct view display as well as to a (front or rear) laser projector system.

Laser TV technology began to appear in the 1990s. In the 21st century, the rapid development and maturity of semiconductor lasers and other technologies gave it new advantages.

== History ==
The laser source for television or video display was originally proposed by Helmut K.V. Lotsch in the German Patent 1 193 166. In December 1970 H.K.V. Lotsch and F. Schroeter explained laser color television for conventional as well as projection-type systems and gave examples of potential applications. 18 years later the German-based company Schneider AG presented a functional laser-TV prototype at IFA'95 in Berlin, Germany. Due to the bankruptcy of Schneider AG, however, the prototype was never developed further to a market-ready product.

Proposed in 1966, laser illumination technology remained too costly to be used in commercially viable consumer products. At the Las Vegas Consumer Electronics Show in 2006, Novalux Inc., developer of Necsel semiconductor laser technology, demonstrated their laser illumination source for projection displays and a prototype rear-projection "laser" TV. First reports on the development of a commercial Laser TV were published as early as February 16, 2006 with a decision on the large-scale availability of laser televisions expected by early 2008. On January 7, 2008, at an event associated with the Consumer Electronics Show 2008, Mitsubishi Digital Electronics America, a key player in high-performance red-laser and large-screen HDTV markets, unveiled their first commercial Laser TV, a 65" 1080p model. A Popular Science writer was impressed by the color rendering of a Mitsubishi laser video display at CES 2008. Some even described it as being too intense to the point of seeming artificial. This laser TV, branded "Mitsubishi LaserVue TV", went on sale, November 16, 2008 for $6,999, but Mitsubishi's entire laser TV project was killed in 2012.

LG introduced a front projected laser TV in 2013 as a consumer product that displays images and videos measuring 100 inches (254 centimeters) with a full high-definition resolution of 1920 x 1080 pixels. It can project images onto the screen at a distance of 22 inches (56 centimeters).

In China, the Sixth Session of the Seventh Council of the China Electronic Video Industry Association formally approved the establishment of a laser TV industry branch. The establishment of the industry branch also symbolizes that the entire industrial chain connecting the upstream and downstream of the laser TV field is officially opened, in order to make the laser TV industry bigger and stronger. By 2022, sales of laser TVs in the Chinese market will exceed 1 million units, and sales will reach 11.8 billion CNY.

== Principle ==
Laser TV images are reflected by the screen and enter the human eye for imaging. The principle of laser TV is to use DLP technology for image display. Take the DMD chip as an example. The DMD chip is the imaging core component of a laser TV. There are millions of small mirrors arranged, and each small mirror can flip in the positive and negative directions at a frequency of tens of thousands of times per second. The light reflects directly on the screen through these small mirrors to form an image. Due to the visual inertia of the human eye, the three primary colors that are irradiated on the same pixel at high speed are mixed and superimposed to form a color.

== Technology ==
Lasers may become an ideal replacement for the UHP lamps which are currently in use in projection display devices such as rear-projection TV and front projectors. LG claims a lifetime of 25,000 hours for their laser projector, compared to 10,000 hours for a UHP. Current televisions are capable of displaying only 40% of the color gamut that humans can potentially perceive.

Color television requires light in three distinct wavelengths—red, green, and blue. While red laser diodes are commercially available, there are no commercially available green laser diodes which can provide the required power at room temperature with an adequate lifetime. Instead, frequency doubling can be used to provide the green wavelengths. Several types of lasers can be used as the frequency doubled sources: fibre lasers, inter-cavity doubled lasers, external cavity doubled lasers, eVCSELs, and OPSLs (Optically Pumped Semiconductor Lasers). Among the inter-cavity doubled lasers, VCSELs have shown much promise and potential to be the basis for a mass-produced frequency doubled laser.

The blue laser diodes became openly available around 2010.

A VECSEL is a vertical cavity, and is composed of two mirrors. On top of one of them is a diode as the active medium. These lasers combine high overall efficiency with good beam quality. The light from the high power IR-laser diodes is converted into visible light by means of extra-cavity waveguided second-harmonic generation. Laser pulses with about 10kHz repetition rate and various lengths are sent to a digital micromirror device where each mirror directs the pulse either onto screen or into the dump. Because the wavelengths are known all coatings can be optimized to reduce reflections and therefore speckle.

== Characteristics ==
Laser TV images are reflected by the screen and enter the human eye for imaging. According to ophthalmologists and professional evaluations, laser TV products are display products that are harmless to the naked eye. The screen has no electromagnetic radiation, which is eye-protecting, healthy and comfortable. Compared with paper reading comfort, it is 20% higher. Laser TVs are mainly large-sized, with pure light sources, bright colors, and authenticity, also support 4K display resolution.

Laser TVs have lower power consumption than LCD TVs of the same size. For example, a 100-inch laser TV consumes less than 300 watts, which is ½-⅓ of the same size LCD TV. Laser TVs are about one-tenth the weight of LCD TVs of the same size, and people can watch 80-inch laser TVs at a viewing distance of 3 meters.

== Assembly ==
=== Laser signal modulation ===
The video signal is introduced to the laser beam by an acousto-optic modulator (AOM) that uses a photorefractive crystal to separate the beam at distinct diffraction angles. The beam must enter the crystal at the specific Bragg angle of that AOM crystal. A piezoelectric element transforms the video signal into vibrations in the crystal to create an image.

=== Horizontal and vertical refresh ===
A rapidly rotating polygonal mirror gives the laser beam the horizontal refresh modulation. It reflects off of a curved mirror onto a galvanometer-mounted mirror which provides the vertical refresh. Another way is to optically spread the beam and modulate each entire line at once, much like in a DLP, reducing the peak power needed in the laser and keeping power consumption constant.

=== Display characteristics ===
- Maintain full power output for the lifespan of the laser; the picture quality will not degrade
- Have a very wide color gamut, which can produce up to 90% of the colors a human eye can perceive by adjusting the wavelength of the laser
- Capable of displaying 3D stereoscopic video
- Can be projected onto any depth or shape surface while maintaining focus.

== Applications ==
There are several realizations of laser projectors, one example being based on the principle of a flying light spot writing the image directly onto a screen. A laser projector of this type consists of three main components — a laser source uses the video signal to provide modulated light composed of the three sharp spectral colors — red, green, and blue — which a flexible, fiber-optic waveguide then transports to a relatively small projection head. The projection head deflects the beam according to the pixel clock and emits it onto a screen at an arbitrary distance. Such laser projection techniques are used in handheld projectors, planetariums, and for flight simulators and other virtual reality applications.

Due to the special features of laser projectors, such as a high depth of field, it is possible to project images or data onto any kind of projection surface, even non-flat. Typically, the sharpness, color space, and contrast ratio are higher than those of other projection technologies. For example, the on-off contrast of a laser projector is typically 50,000:1 and higher, while modern DLP and LCD projectors range from 1000:1 to 40,000:1. In comparison to conventional projectors, laser projectors provide a lower luminous flux output, but because of the extremely high contrast the brightness actually appears to be greater.

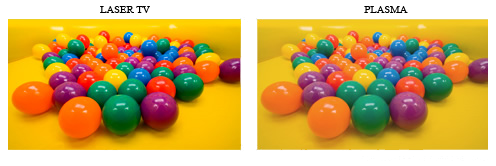
An example of an image of plastic balls on a Laser TV compared to a Plasma TV

== Development status ==
In order to further accelerate the adoption of laser displays, the China Ministry of Science and Technology has prioritized the "engineering and development of next-generation laser display technology" as one of the eight major industrial development directions. As related technical problems are gradually resolved, the popularization of laser TV products in households remains a major goal.

At the end of December 2019, the CESI Laboratory of the China National Institute of Electronic Standardization and a team of ophthalmologists from Peking Union Medical College Hospital conducted a research project regarding the visual perception and eye strain of laser displays. In the study, 32 subjects were placed in the same environmental conditions comparing a laser TV and a LCD TV. Eye blinking frequency and the subjective perception score were compared and analyzed between the displays. The results found that watching the LCD TV for an extended period of time produced certain symptoms such as eye swelling, eye pain, photophobia, dry eyes, and blurred vision, while watching the laser TV, there was no obvious visual change or eye discomfort.

On January 16, 2020, the Laser Television Industry Branch of the China Electronic Video Industry Association released the industry's first White Paper on Laser TV Eye Care in Shanghai. The white paper published the eye-care evaluation data of laser TVs and traditional LCD TVs by ophthalmology experts of China Electronics Technology Standardization Institute's CESI Laboratory and Peking Union Medical College Hospital, and made scientific suggestions on how to protect the visual health of adolescents. The market for laser TVs has seen an overall compound growth rate of 281% from 2014 to 2019. In 2019, the Hisense Laser TV 80L5 ranked first in the annual TV bestseller list. According to user survey data, more than 93% of users chose laser TVs because of the claimed benefits of eye health protection.

== Prospect ==
Compared with LED backlit LCD TVs, laser TVs have many advantages in large-screen imaging. In terms of technical composition, a laser TV is composed of laser light source, imaging module, circuit control system, and display. The technological progress of each of these units will help to increase market share compared to competing display technologies. Additionally, laser light sources have the advantages of lower manufacturing carbon emissions, higher color gamut, and higher energy efficiency. The advancement of laser television combined with better optical imaging technology can be lucrative in the future home display market.

== Technical challenges ==
Lasers are the most expensive components of laser televisions. More advanced laser diodes usually need more semiconductor materials to be manufactured, so reducing costs will remain an issue for the industrialization of laser TV for the foreseeable future. Existing laser TV products generally use imported semiconductor devices. In current large-screen display solutions, there are a variety of competing technologies such as LCD, OLED, and upcoming Micro LED displays. Laser TVs must continue to develop to maintain a competitive advantage in order to occupy a larger market share.
