= Silk screen effect =

Visual phenomenon seen in rear-projection televisions

The silk screen effect (SSE) is a visual phenomenon seen in rear-projection televisions. SSE is described by viewers as seeing the texture of the television screen in front of the image. SSE may be found on all rear-projection televisions including DLP and Liquid Crystal on Silicon (LCoS). The effect is most visible when viewing bright white or very light colored images. Viewers also report seeing "sparkles" when viewing very bright colored images.

SSE's nomenclature comes from the visual appearance of this effect, which is likened to viewing an image through a silk screen. SSE should not be confused with the screen door effect, another visual phenomenon seen in rear-projection televisions.

== Cause of SSE ==
SSE is caused by textured screens used in most rear-projection televisions. Rear-projection television manufacturers use textured screens to increase the viewing angle of the television.

== Reducing SSE ==
SSE can be reduced by properly calibrating the picture controls of the rear-projection television. SSE is most prominent when the contrast and brightness are set too high. Adjusting the brightness and contrast and properly calibrating the picture controls can reduce SSE.

== See also ==
- Digital Light Processing
- Liquid Crystal on Silicon
- Screen-door effect
