= Screen-door effect =

Visual artifact of displays

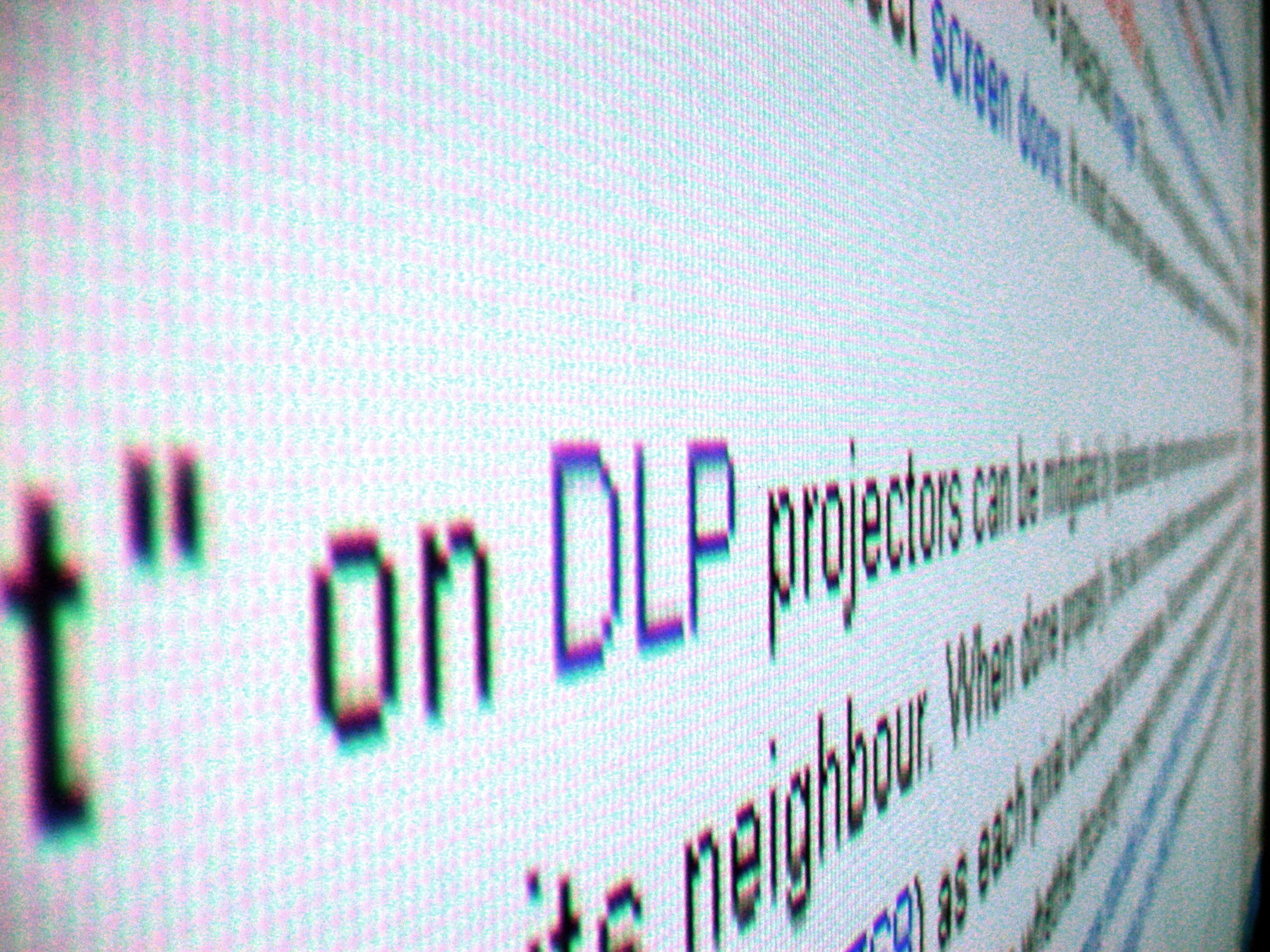
Demonstration of the screen door effect

The screen-door effect (SDE) is a visual artifact of displays, where the fine lines separating pixels (or subpixels) become visible in the displayed image. This effect can be seen in digital projector images and regular displays under magnification or at close range, but the increases in display resolutions have made this much less significant. More recently, the screen-door effect has been an issue with virtual reality headsets and other head-mounted displays, because these are viewed at a much closer distance, and stretch a single display across a much wider field of view.

== SDE in projectors ==
In LCD and DLP projectors, SDE can be seen because of pixel visibility - specifically, the physical gaps inherent in a fixed-pixel grid structure rather than a limitation of the projector optics. When projecting a large image, especially at lower resolutions like 480p or 720p, the area of individual pixels increases, causing the spaces between them to become visible to the eye. This results in an image that appears distorted, as if viewed through a fine screen or mesh such as those used on anti-insect screen doors.

The screen-door effect was noticed on the first digital projector: an LCD projector made in 1984 by Gene Dolgoff. To eliminate this artifact, Dolgoff invented de-pixelization, which used various optical methods to eliminate the visibility of the spaces between the pixels. The dominant method made use of a microlens array, wherein each micro-lens caused a slightly magnified image of the pixel behind it, filling in the previously visible spaces between pixels. In addition, when making a projector with a single, full-color LCD panel, an additional appearance of pixelation was visible due to the noticeability of green pixels (appearing bright) adjacent to red and blue pixels (appearing dark), forming a noticeable repeating light and dark pattern. Use of a micro-lens array at a slightly greater distance created new pixel images, with each "new" pixel being a summation of six neighboring sub-pixels (made up of two full color pixels, one above the other). Since there were as many micro-lenses as there were original pixels, no resolution was lost, which was confirmed with modulation transfer function (MTF) measurements.

The screen-door effect on Digital Light Processing (DLP) projectors can be mitigated by deliberately setting the projected image slightly out of focus, which blurs the boundaries of each pixel to its neighbor. This minimizes the effect by filling the black pixel perimeters with adjacent light. Some older LCD projectors have a more noticeable screen-door effect than first-generation DLP projectors. Newer DLP chip designs promise closer spacing of the mirror elements which would reduce this effect; however, some space is still required along one edge of the mirror to provide a control circuit pathway. Use of Dolgoff's depixelization method could also produce a DLP projector without noticeable pixelation.

== See also ==
- Moiré pattern
- Pancake lens
- Rainbow effect, an artifact associated with single-chip DLP projectors
- Scan line
- Silk screen effect
- Subpixel rendering
- Uncanny valley
- Vergence-accommodation conflict
- Virtual reality sickness
