= Laser projector =

Device which creates images with lasers

A laser projector is a device that projects changing laser beams on a screen to create a moving image for entertainment or professional use. It consists of a housing that contains lasers, mirrors, galvanometer scanners, and other optical components. A laser projector may contain one laser light source for single-color projection or three sources for RGB (red, green, and blue) full color projection.

Lasers can produce brighter projected images than a conventional projector, with HDR and more vibrant colors.

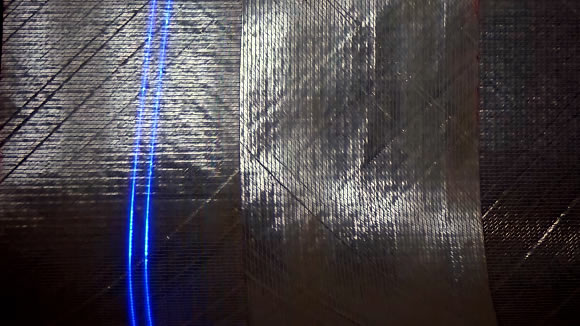
Blue laser projection on composite material

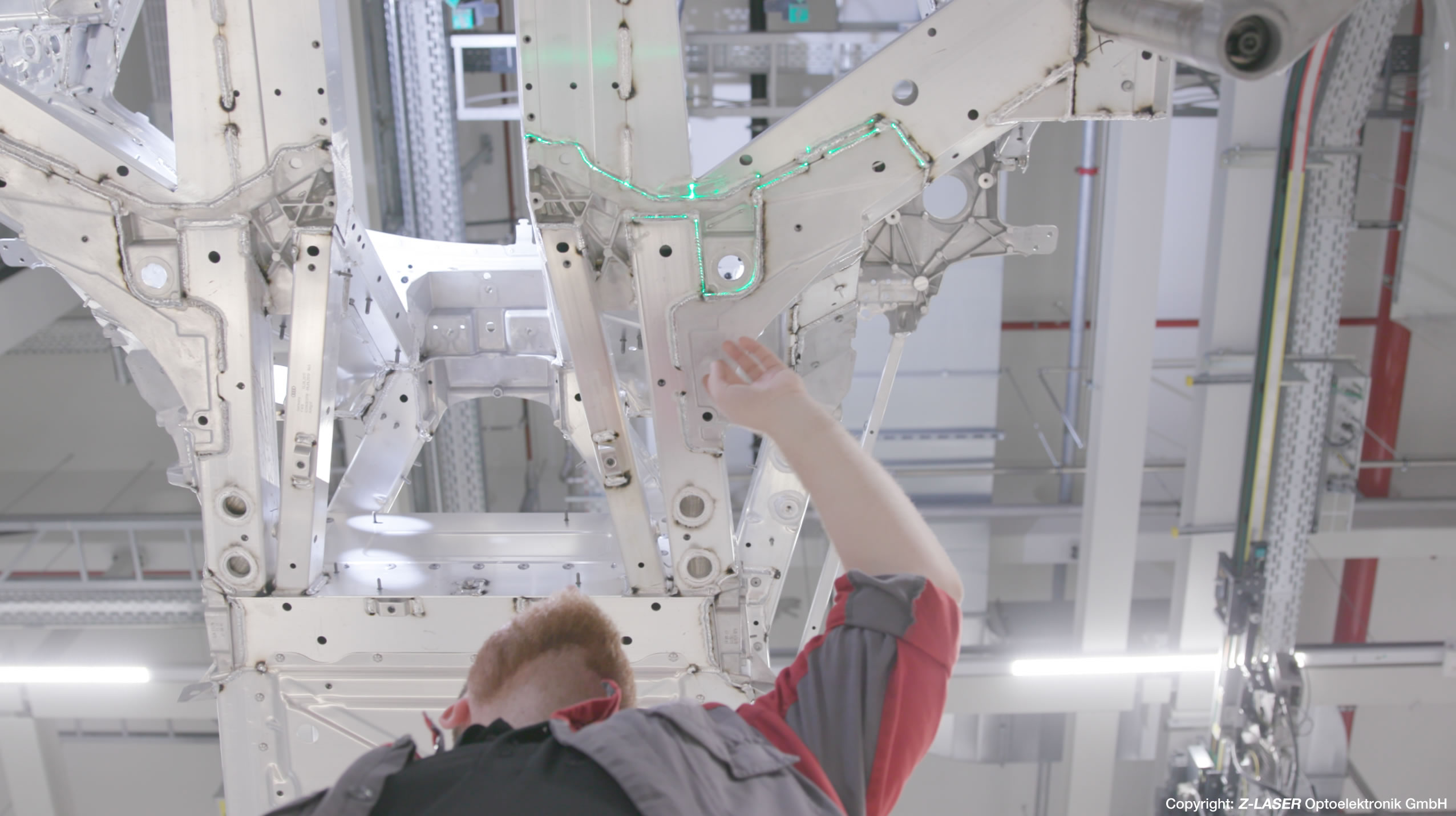
A laser projector projects different laser lines on welding seams on an aluminum car body

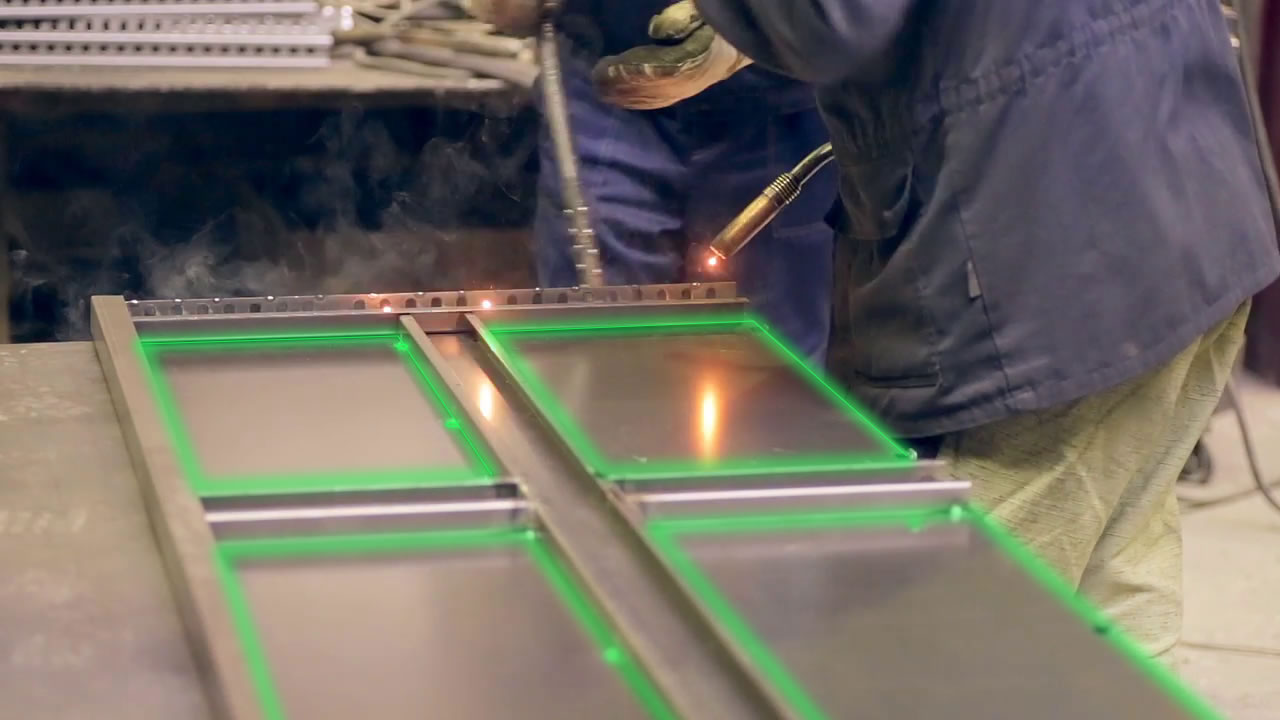
In the steel industry for example laser projectors are used for the steel framing. Thereby the frame where the steel needs to be welded can be displayed.

== Types ==
- Industrial laser projectors are used as a guide, like a stencil in various manufacturing processes.
- Home entertainment laser projectors have a wider color gamut and longer life.

=== Industrial laser projectors ===
Industrial laser projectors have been on the market since the early 2000s. Laser projectors are mainly used as optical guidance systems. They enable working without templates in many manufacturing processes by showing directly on the workpiece how material needs to be positioned or mounted, so that the employee is led by manual or semiautomatic production processes visually.

==== Advantages ====
- Fast and stable projection with high repetition rate (50 Hz)
- Optimized for 2D and 3D objects
- Highest accuracy of projection
- Wide optical angle (80° × 80°) allows bigger working sites
- Multi-projection system for huge and complex projections

==== Industries ====
- Blades for wind turbines
- Assembly support and workpiece control in 3D
- Laminated beam manufacturing
- Boat construction
- Caravan construction
- Gluing tables – CNC-BAZ – rip saws (stair construction)
- Nail truss
- Paper rolls
- Cable harness production
- Aerospace
- Leather nesting
- CNC machining centre
- Alignment of steel plates
- Inspection of metal surfaces
- Laser-supported placement of formwork for concrete steps
- Prefabricated concrete parts: Wall and ceiling elements

Depending on material to project on different colors can be used.

==== Advantages of this method ====
- Material and time saving by an optimized workflow
- Immediate visual quality control
- Rise in productivity
- Laser projection with high representation precision and quality

== Typical components ==
=== Laser diodes (direct injection) ===
- Red: 635 nm, 638 nm, 642 nm, 650 nm, 660 nm
- Green: 515 nm, 520 nm
- Blue: 445 nm
- Violet: 405 nm

=== Solid state DPSS (diode-pumped, frequency-doubled) ===
- Red: 671 nm
- Green: 532 nm
- Blue: 473 nm, 457 nm

=== Gas lasers ===
- Red: HeNe (Helium-Neon) @ 632.8 nm, Krypton @ 647.1 nm
- Green: Argon @ 514.5 nm
- Blue: Argon @ 488 nm or 457.9 nm
- Multi-color (whitelight): Mixed gas Argon/Krypton 647.1 nm, 514.5 nm, 488 nm, 476.5 nm, 457.9 nm

=== Galvanometer scanners ===
Galvanometers (also called "scanners" or "galvos") are computer-controlled electromagnetic devices that move mirrors mounted on the end of rotary shafts. The mirror reflects the laser beam to "draw" images. Galvanometers are typically identified by their speed of operation, measured in Kpps (kilo points per second). Available speeds include 8k, 12k, 20k, 30k, 35k, 50k, and 60k. The faster the galvanometers, the smoother and more flicker-free the projected image. Each galvanometer moves the beam in one plane, either X axis or Y axis. Placing the galvanometers close together at 90 degrees to each other allows full movement of the laser beam within a defined square area. The most useful specifications of a galvanometer pair for laser show use are the speed at which they can draw points, and the angle at which they achieve this speed. Galvanometers come in two main groups: open loop and closed loop. Closed loop, which is most common, means the galvanometer is controlled by a servo system—the control circuit uses a feedback signal generated by the mirror's motion to correct motion commands. An amplifier similar to an audio power amplifier drives the mirror.

=== Controller (DAC) ===
In the case of using a computer to control a laser projector, a digital-to-analog converter (DAC) is needed to convert the digital control signal from the computer into analog signals that control the scanners in the laser projector. Typically, two channels are used for x-y position control and three channels are used for controlling the RGB values of an RGB projector. For a single-color projector, the intensity channel is used instead of the RGB channels. Most commercially available projectors and DACs are compatible with the ILDA standard that specifies the channels and pinout for the 25-pin D-SUB input connector on the projector.

=== DMX ===
Many laser projectors and galvanometer sets include digital multiplexing (DMX) input. DMX was originally designed to control theatrical lighting, but has spread to laser projectors over the years.

DMX allows the user to control the inbuilt patterns of the projector. A few of these features are size, pattern, color and rotation. However, DMX does not allow the user to design and display their own graphics/animations, it is simply a way of controlling the patterns included in the laser projector.

=== Dichroic mirrors ===
A dichroic mirror is a mirror with different reflection or transmission properties at two different wavelengths. Typical dichroic mirrors used in laser projectors pass red light and reflect green and blue, or pass green light and reflect red and blue. Dichroic mirrors are required for combining laser beams of different colors, e.g. to combine the red, green and blue beams into a single white-light beam. The individual red, blue and green lasers are then controlled in brightness (modulated) to produce any desired color in the final beam. A typical analog-modulated RGB projector has 256 brightness levels for each laser. This gives 16,777,216 different possible colors (the same as a modern computer monitor).

== Typical terminology ==
=== Blanking ===
Blanking is a state in which the laser beam turns off while the mirrors change position while creating the image. Blanking typically happens hundreds of times per second. New solid-state lasers use direct electronic control of the laser source to provide blanking. With gas lasers, such as argon or krypton, this was not possible, and blanking was carried out using a third galvanometer that mechanically interrupted the beam. New technology brought a Poly-Chromatic Acousto-Optic Modulator, or PCAOM, which provided high-speed electronic blanking, intensity control, and color selection of a multi-color laser beam.

=== Modulation ===
Most DPSS lasers used in laser projectors support modulation. Modulation has to do with blanking but is a slightly broader term. A DPSS laser supports either analog modulation, TTL modulation, or both. Modulation is usually specified in terms of kHz. 2 kHz can be considered low and 30 kHz can be considered high. Manufacturers generally do not specify an exact relationship between this number and the behavior of the laser.

=== Analog modulation ===
An analog signal is used to control the intensity of the output beam. This signal is usually a voltage in the range of 0 V to 5 V. With an RGB laser and analog modulation there are, with an 8-bit system, 16.7 million total colors available.

However, since most laser show software uses a 0–100% control for laser brightness modulation (therefore 100 steps instead of 255), the total of available colors at disposal is only 1 million. Furthermore, usual laser sources start at a voltage between 1 and 2 volts and reach their full brightness at voltages between 3.5 and 4V, and the power/voltage curve between these points are usually not perfectly linear. Consequently, the dynamics of the color palette in a real laser show is decreased to only a few thousand possible colors.

=== TTL modulation ===
TTL modulation indicates that the laser does not support analog modulation of the output but only ON / OFF control. See blanking. With an RGB laser and TTL blanking there seven colors available: red, green, blue, cyan, magenta, yellow, and white.

=== ILDA ===
The International Laser Display Association. A trade association dedicated to promoting the use of laser displays.

=== Scan angle ===
Scan angle is the optical angle that a set of scanners normally achieves at a given rate of points per second. The wider the angle, the larger the area the scan covers—but the more difficult it is for the scanner accurately track its movement due to physical limitations of the scanner mechanism. For example, a 20-degree angle provides a 3.5-meter scanned area at a distance of 10 meters from scanner to screen. Scan angles can be calculated using trigonometry.

== See also ==
- Laser TV
