= Liquid crystal on silicon =

Type of display technology

Liquid crystal on silicon (LCoS or LCOS) is a miniaturized reflective active-matrix liquid-crystal display or "microdisplay" using a liquid crystal layer on top of a silicon backplane. It is also known as a spatial light modulator. LCoS initially was developed for projection televisions, but has since found additional uses in wavelength selective switching, structured illumination, near-eye displays and optical pulse shaping.

JVC's development of LCoS is branded as Direct-drive Image Light Amplifier (D-ILA), while Sony's own development is branded as Silicon X-tal Reflective Display (SXRD).

LCoS is distinct from LCD projection technology, which uses transmissive LCD panel(s) that block or allow light through. LCoS is more similar to DLP displays.

== Technology ==
Hughes LCLV schematic

The Hughes liquid crystal light valve (LCLV) was designed to modulate a high-intensity light beam using a weaker light source, conceptually similar to how an amplifier increases the amplitude of an electrical signal; LCLV was named after the common name for the triode vacuum tube. A high-resolution, low-intensity light source (typically a CRT) was used to "write" an image in the CdS photosensor layer, which is energized by a transparent indium tin oxide electrode, driven by an alternating current source at approximately 10 mV. A CdTe light-blocking layer prevents the low-intensity writing light from shining through the device; the photosensor and light-blocking layer together form a rectifying junction, producing a DC voltage bias across the liquid crystal layer, transferring the image to the reflecting side by changing the rotation of polarization in the twisted nematic liquid crystal. On the reflecting side, a high-intensity, polarized projection light source reflects selectively from the dielectric mirror based on the polarization within the liquid crystal being controlled by the photosensor. The dielectric mirror is formed by sputtering alternating layers of TiO_{2} and SiO_{2}, with the final SiO_{2} layer etched to align the liquid crystal material. Later development of the LCLV used similar semiconductor materials arranged in the same basic structures.

Hughes-JVC D-ILA schematic

The LCLV principle is carried forward in a digital LCoS display device, which features an array of pixels, each equivalent to the reflecting side of a single LCLV. These pixels on the LCoS device are driven directly by signals to modulate the intensity of reflected light, rather than a low intensity "writing light" source in the LCLV. For example, a chip with XGA resolution has an array of 1024×768 pixels, each with an independently addressable transistor. In the LCoS device, a complementary metal–oxide–semiconductor (CMOS) chip controls the voltage on square reflective aluminium electrodes buried just below the chip surface, each controlling one pixel. Typical chips are approximately 1–3 cm (0.39–1.18 in) square and approximately 2 mm (0.079 in) thick, with pixel pitch as small as 2.79 μm (0.110 mils). A common voltage for all the pixels is supplied by a transparent conductive layer made of indium tin oxide on the cover glass.

== Displays ==
=== History ===
The history of LCoS projectors dates back to June 1972, when LCLV technology was first developed by scientists at Hughes Research Laboratories working on an internal research and development project. General Electric demonstrated a low-resolution LCoS display in the late 1970s. LCLV projectors were used primarily for military flight simulators due to their large and bulky size. A joint venture between Hughes Electronics and JVC (Hughes-JVC) was founded in 1992 to develop LCLV technology for commercial movie theaters under the branding ILA (Image Light Amplifer). One example was 72.5 in (1,840 mm) tall and weighed 1,670 lb (760 kg), using a 7 kW Xenon arc lamp.

Conceptual diagram of an LCoS projector

In 1997, engineers at JVC developed the D-ILA (Direct-drive Image Light Amplifier) from the Hughes LCLV, which led to smaller and more affordable digital LCoS projectors, using three-chip D-ILA devices. Although these were not as bright and had less resolution than the cinema ILA projectors, they were more portable, starting at 33 lb (15 kg).

The early LCoS projectors had their challenges. They suffered from a phenomenon called "image sticking," where the image would remain on the screen after it was supposed to be gone. This was due to the mirrors sticking in their positions, which resulted in ghosting on the screen. However, manufacturers continued to refine the technology, and today's LCoS projectors have largely overcome this issue.

Sony introduced its SXRD (Silicon X-tal Reflective Display) technology in 2003, with Full HD resolution. SXRD was an evolution of LCoS technology that used even smaller pixels and a higher resolution, resulting in an even more accurate image. 4K SXRD panels were developed the following year. The SXRD technology was used in Sony's high-end home theater projectors, and it quickly gained a reputation for its exceptional picture quality.

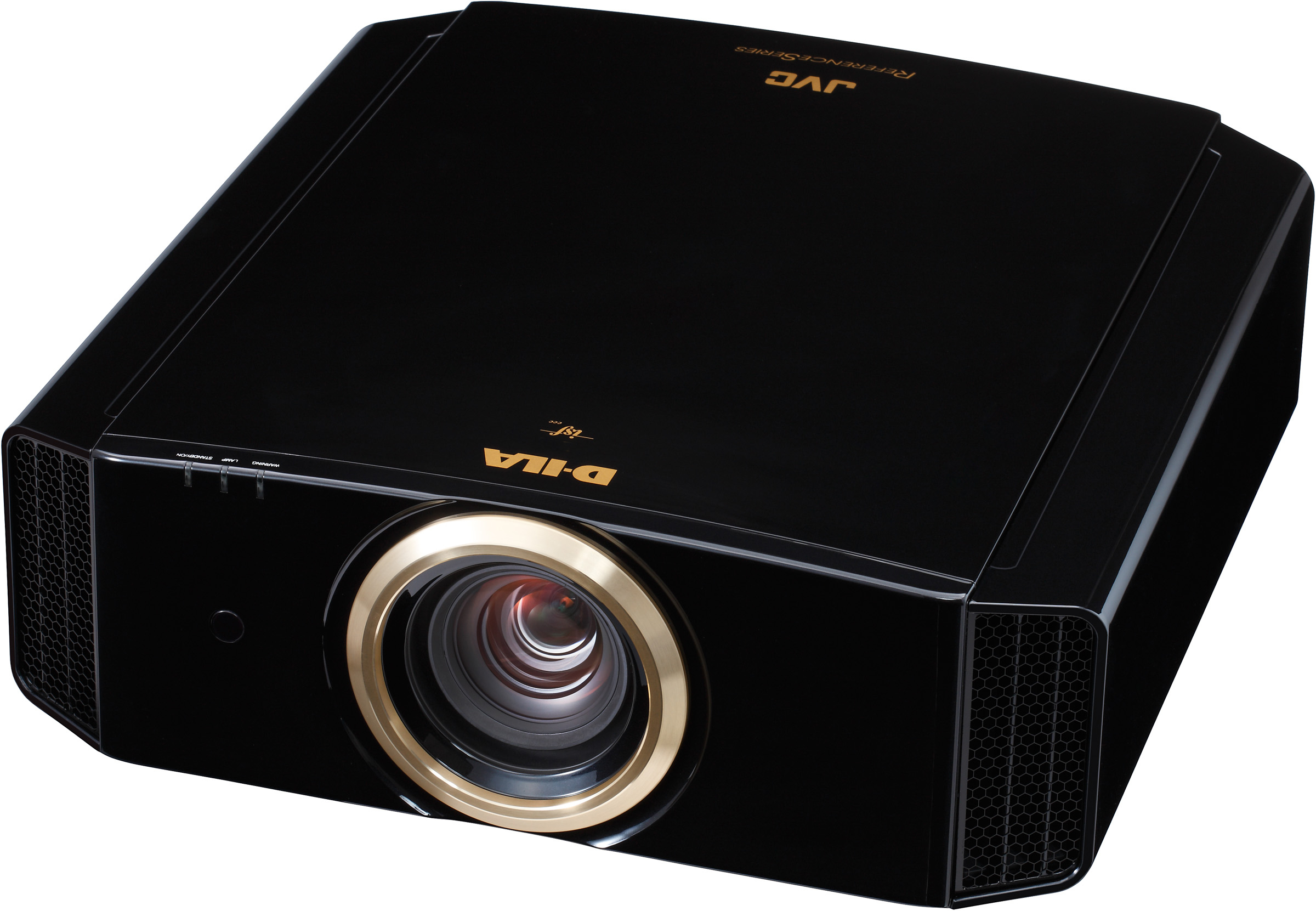
A JVC D-ILA projector

JVC introduced an updated D-ILA technology in 2006, which eliminated the need for a polarizing filter, resulting in a brighter and more vibrant image. The D-ILA technology has since become a popular choice for home theater enthusiasts.

LCoS projectors have continued to evolve, with manufacturers introducing features like 4K resolution and HDR (High Dynamic Range) support. LCoS projectors are now available at a range of price points, from affordable models for home theater use to high-end professional models used in commercial installations.

=== Display system architectures ===
LCoS display technology is a type of microdisplay that has gained popularity due to its high image quality and ability to display high-resolution images. LCoS display systems typically consist of three main components: the LCoS panel, the light source, and the optical system.

The LCoS panel is the heart of the display system. It consists of an array of pixels that are arranged in a grid pattern. Each pixel is made up of a liquid crystal layer, a reflective layer, and a silicon substrate. The liquid crystal layer controls the polarization of light that passes through it, while the reflective layer reflects the light back towards the optical system. The silicon substrate is used to control the individual pixels and provides the necessary electronics to drive the LCoS panel.

The light source is used to provide the necessary illumination for the LCoS panel. The most common light source used in LCoS display systems is a high-intensity lamp. This lamp emits a broad spectrum of light that is filtered through a color wheel or other optical components to provide the necessary color gamut for the display system.

The optical system is responsible for directing the light from the light source onto the LCoS panel and projecting the resulting image onto a screen or other surface. The optical system consists of a number of lenses, mirrors, and other optical components that are carefully designed and calibrated to provide the necessary magnification, focus, and color correction for the display system.

==== Three-panel designs ====
The white light is separated into three components (red, green and blue) and then combined back after modulation by the 3 LCoS devices. The light is additionally polarized by beam splitters.

==== One-panel designs ====
Both Toshiba's and Intel's single-panel LCOS display program were discontinued in 2004 before any units reached final-stage prototype. There were single-panel LCoS displays in production: One by Philips and one by Microdisplay Corporation. Forth Dimension Displays continues to offer a Ferroelectric LCoS display technology (known as Time Domain Imaging) available in QXGA, SXGA and WXGA resolutions which today is used for high resolution near-eye applications such as Training & Simulation, structured light pattern projection for AOI. Citizen Finedevice (CFD) also continues to manufacturer single panel RGB displays using FLCoS technology (Ferroelectric Liquid Crystals). They manufacture displays in multiple resolutions and sizes that are currently used in pico-projectors, electronic viewfinders for high end digital cameras, and head-mounted displays.

=== Pico projectors, near-eye and head-mounted displays ===
Whilst initially developed for large-screen projectors, LCoS displays have found a consumer niche in the area of pico-projectors, where their small size and low power consumption are well-matched to the constraints of such devices.

LCoS devices are also used in near-eye applications such as electronic viewfinders for digital cameras, film cameras, and head-mounted displays (HMDs). These devices are made using ferroelectric liquid crystals (so the technology is named FLCoS) which are inherently faster than other types of liquid crystals to produce high quality images. Google's initial foray into wearable computing, Google glass, also uses a near-eye LCoS display.

At CES 2018, Hong Kong Applied Science and Technology Research Institute Company Limited (ASTRI) and OmniVision showcased a reference design for a wireless augmented reality headset that could achieve 60 degree field of view (FoV). It combined a single-chip 1080p LCOS display and image sensor from OmniVision with ASTRI's optics and electronics. The headset is said to be smaller and lighter than others because of its single-chip design with integrated driver and memory buffer.

== Wavelength-selective switches ==
LCoS is particularly attractive as a switching mechanism in a wavelength-selective switch (WSS). LCoS-based WSS were initially developed by Australian company Engana, now part of Finisar. The LCoS can be employed to control the phase of light at each pixel to produce beam-steering where the large number of pixels allow a near continuous addressing capability. Typically, a large number of phase steps are used to create a highly efficient, low-insertion loss switch shown. This simple optical design incorporates polarisation diversity, control of mode size and a 4-f wavelength optical imaging in the dispersive axis of the LCoS providing integrated switching and optical power control.

In operation, the light passes from a fibre array through the polarisation imaging optics which separates physically and aligns orthogonal polarisation states to be in the high efficiency s-polarisation state of the diffraction grating. The input light from a chosen fibre of the array is reflected from the imaging mirror and then angularly dispersed by the grating which is at near Littrow incidence, reflecting the light back to the imaging optics which directs each channel to a different portion of the LCoS. The path for each wavelength is then retraced upon reflection from the LCoS, with the beam-steering image applied on the LCOS directing the light to a particular port of the fibre array. As the wavelength channels are separated on the LCoS the switching of each wavelength is independent of all others and can be switched without interfering with the light on other channels. There are many different algorithms that can be implemented to achieve a given coupling between ports including less efficient "images" for attenuation or power splitting.

WSS based on MEMS and/or liquid crystal technologies allocate a single switching element (pixel) to each channel which means the bandwidth and centre frequency of each channel are fixed at the time of manufacture and cannot be changed in service. In addition, many designs of first-generation WSS (particularly those based on MEMs technology) show pronounced dips in the transmission spectrum between each channel due to the limited spectral ‘fill factor’ inherent in these designs. This prevents the simple concatenation of adjacent channels to create a single broader channel.

LCoS-based WSS, however, permit dynamic control of channel centre frequency and bandwidth through on-the-fly modification of the pixel arrays via embedded software. The degree of control of channel parameters can be very fine-grained, with independent control of the centre frequency and either upper- or lower-band-edge of a channel with better than 1 GHz resolution possible. This is advantageous from a manufacturability perspective, with different channel plans being able to be created from a single platform and even different operating bands (such as C and L) being able to use an identical switch matrix. Additionally, it is possible to take advantage of this ability to reconfigure channels while the device is operating. Products have been introduced allowing switching between 50 GHz channels and 100 GHz channels, or a mix of channels, without introducing any errors or "hits" to the existing traffic. More recently, this has been extended to support the whole concept of Flexible or Elastic networks under ITU G.654.2 through products such as Finisar's Flexgrid™ WSS.

== Other LCoS applications ==
=== Optical pulse shaping ===
The ability of an LCoS-based WSS to independently control both the amplitude and phase of the transmitted signal leads to the more general ability to manipulate the amplitude and/or phase of an optical pulse through a process known as Fourier-domain pulse shaping. This process requires full characterisation of the input pulse in both the time and spectral domains.

As an example, an LCoS-based Programmable Optical Processor (POP) has been used to broaden a mode-locked laser output into a 20 nm supercontinuum source whilst a second such device was used to compress the output to 400 fs, transform-limited pulses. Passive mode-locking of fiber lasers has been demonstrated at high repetition rates, but inclusion of an LCoS-based POP allowed the phase content of the spectrum to be changed to flip the pulse train of a passively mode-locked laser from bright to dark pulses. A similar approach uses spectral shaping of optical frequency combs to create multiple pulse trains. For example, a 10 GHz optical frequency comb was shaped by the POP to generate dark parabolic pulses and Gaussian pulses, at 1540 nm and 1560 nm, respectively.

=== Light structuring ===
Structured light using a fast ferroelectric LCoS is used in 3D-superresolution microscopy techniques and in fringe projection for 3D-automated optical inspection.

=== Modal switching in space division multiplexed optical communications systems ===
One of the interesting applications of LCoS is the ability to transform between modes of few-moded optical fibers which have been proposed as the basis of higher capacity transmission systems in the future. Similarly LCoS has been used to steer light into selected cores of multicore fiber transmission systems, again as a type of Space Division Multiplexing.

=== Tunable lasers ===
LCoS has been used as a filtering technique, and hence a tuning mechanism, for both semiconductor diode and fiber lasers.

== See also ==
- Digital Light Processing – Set of chipsets
