= LCD projector =

Type of video projector

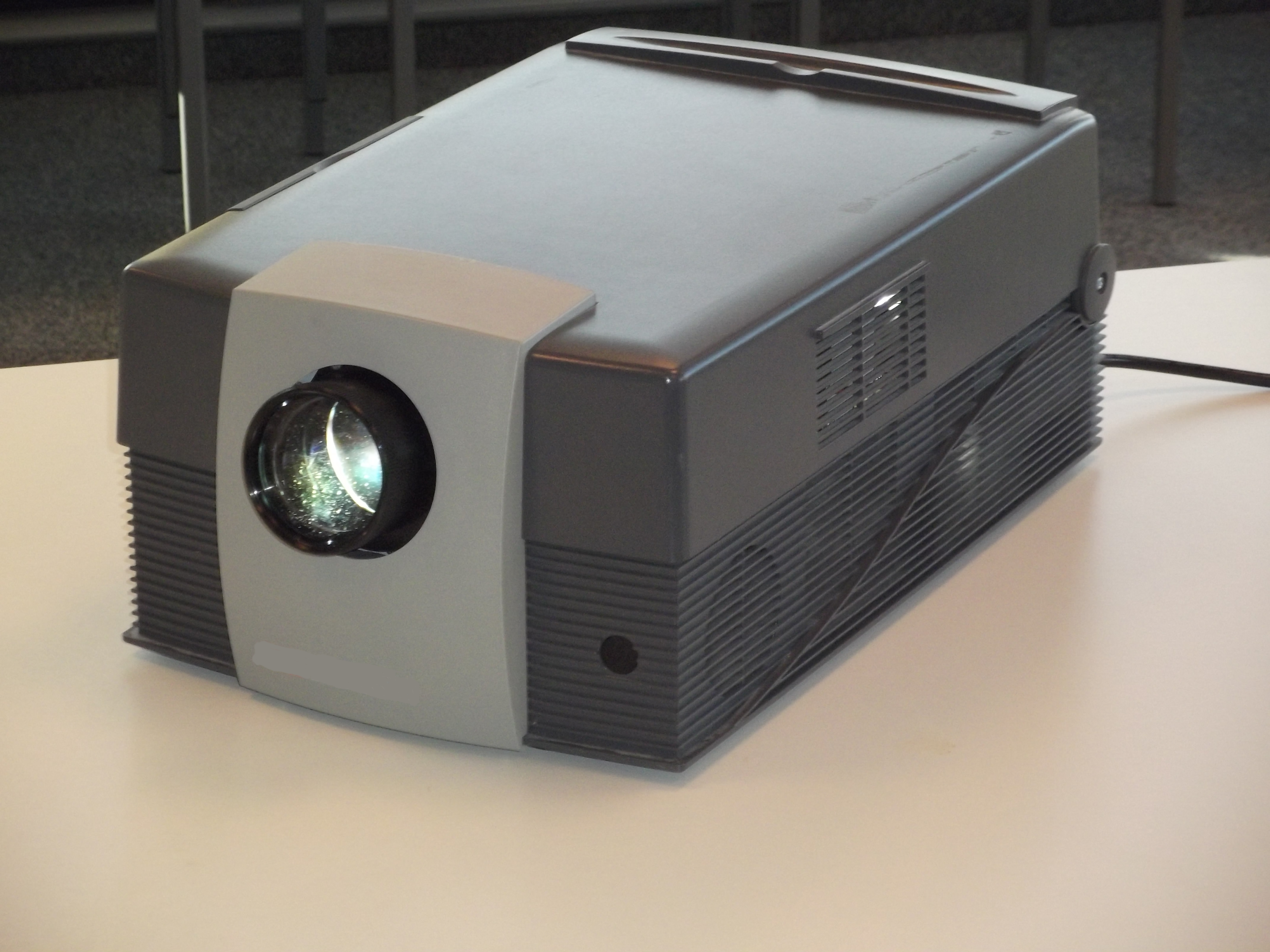
Liesegang LCD Projector

An LCD projector is a type of video projector for displaying video, images or computer data on a screen or other flat surface. It is a modern equivalent of the slide projector or overhead projector. To display images, LCD (liquid-crystal display) projectors typically send light from a metal-halide lamp through a prism or series of dichroic filters that separates light to three polysilicon panels – one each for the red, green and blue components of the video signal. As polarized light passes through the panels (combination of polarizer, polysilicon LCD panel and analyzer), individual pixels can be opened (made transparent controlled by electricity) to allow light to pass or closed (made opaque controlled by electricity) to block the light. The combination of open and closed pixels can produce a wide range of colors and shades in the projected image.

Metal-halide lamps are used because they output an ideal color temperature and a broad spectrum of color. These lamps also have the ability to produce an extremely large amount of light within a small area; current projectors average about 2,000 to 15,000 American National Standards Institute (ANSI) lumens.

Other technologies, such as digital light processing (DLP) and liquid crystal on silicon (LCOS) are also becoming more popular in modestly priced video projection.

== Projection surfaces ==
Because they use small lamps and the ability to project an image on any flat surface, LCD projectors tend to be smaller and more portable than some other types of projection systems. Even so, the best image quality is found using a blank white, grey, or black (which blocks reflected ambient light) surface, so dedicated projection screens are often used.

Perceived color in a projected image is a factor of both the projection surface and the projector quality. Since white is more of a neutral color, white surfaces are best suited for natural color tones; as such, white projection surfaces are more common in most business and school presentation environments.

However, darkest black in a projected image is dependent on how dark the screen is. Because of this, some presenters and presentation-space planners prefer gray screens, which create higher-perceived contrast. The trade-off is that darker backgrounds can throw off color tones. Color problems can sometimes be adjusted through the projector settings, but may not be as accurate as they would be on a white background.

== Throw ratio ==
A projector's throw ratio is used when installing projectors to control the size of the projected display. For example, if the throw ratio is 2:1 and the projector is fourteen feet away from the screen, then the display width will be seven feet.

== History ==
Early experiments with liquid crystals to generate a video image were done by John A. van Raalte at the RCA-Laboratories in 1968. His concept was based on e-beam-addressing to generate an electronic charge pattern corresponding to a video image, which in turn controlled the LC layer of a reflective LC cell. E-beam-addressing requires a CRT with a modified faceplate to generate a charge pattern on its surface. No practical application of this concept for projection purposes is known. However, a similar concept was used for print heads without an LCD.

The first experiments with a direct-driven, transmissive matrix-addressed LCD using a converted slide projector by Peter J. Wild working at Brown Boveri Research in Switzerland were conducted in 1971. A projector was shown in operation at the SID Conference 1972 in San Francisco. As direct-driven, passive LCDs (without thin-film transistors) at the matrix intersections) were not capable of displaying images with sufficient resolution for video pictures, a combination of a fixed image together with an LCD matrix for the variable elements was proposed as an LC projector for certain control room applications, with a corresponding patent filed in Switzerland on Dec. 3, 1971.

A lot of effort went into optimizing thin-film transistors (TFTs) suitable for active matrix-addressed (AM) LCDs. The concept was invented and early trials were conducted by teams at RCA and Westinghouse Electric. T Peter Brody left Westinghouse and founded Panelvision in 1981 to manufacture AM LCDs. Breakthroughs occurred elsewhere in new materials and thin-film structures, with Hitachi of Japan as a pioneering company. Such AM LCDs became commercially available in the early 1980s.

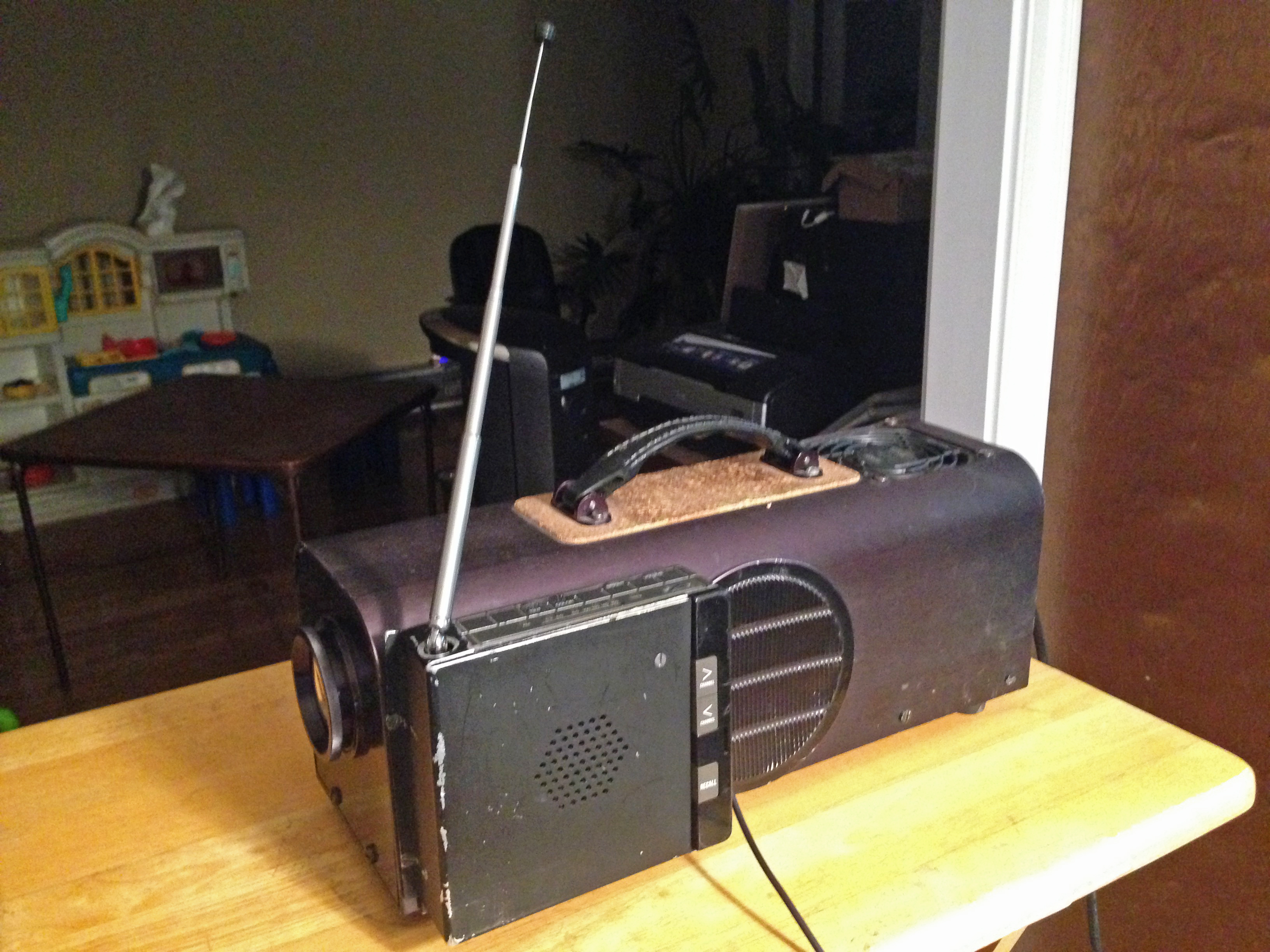
Gene Dolgoff's original LCD Projector prototype

Gene Dolgoff had the idea of using LCDs as light valves in projectors. However, he had to wait until 1984 to get a digitally-addressable LCD matrix device with sufficient resolution and contrast, which is when he completed building his LCD video projector. After building it, he saw many problems that had to be corrected including major light losses and very noticeable pixels (sometimes referred to as the "screen-door effect"). He then invented new optical methods to create efficient and bright projectors and invented depixelization to reduce the screen-door effect.

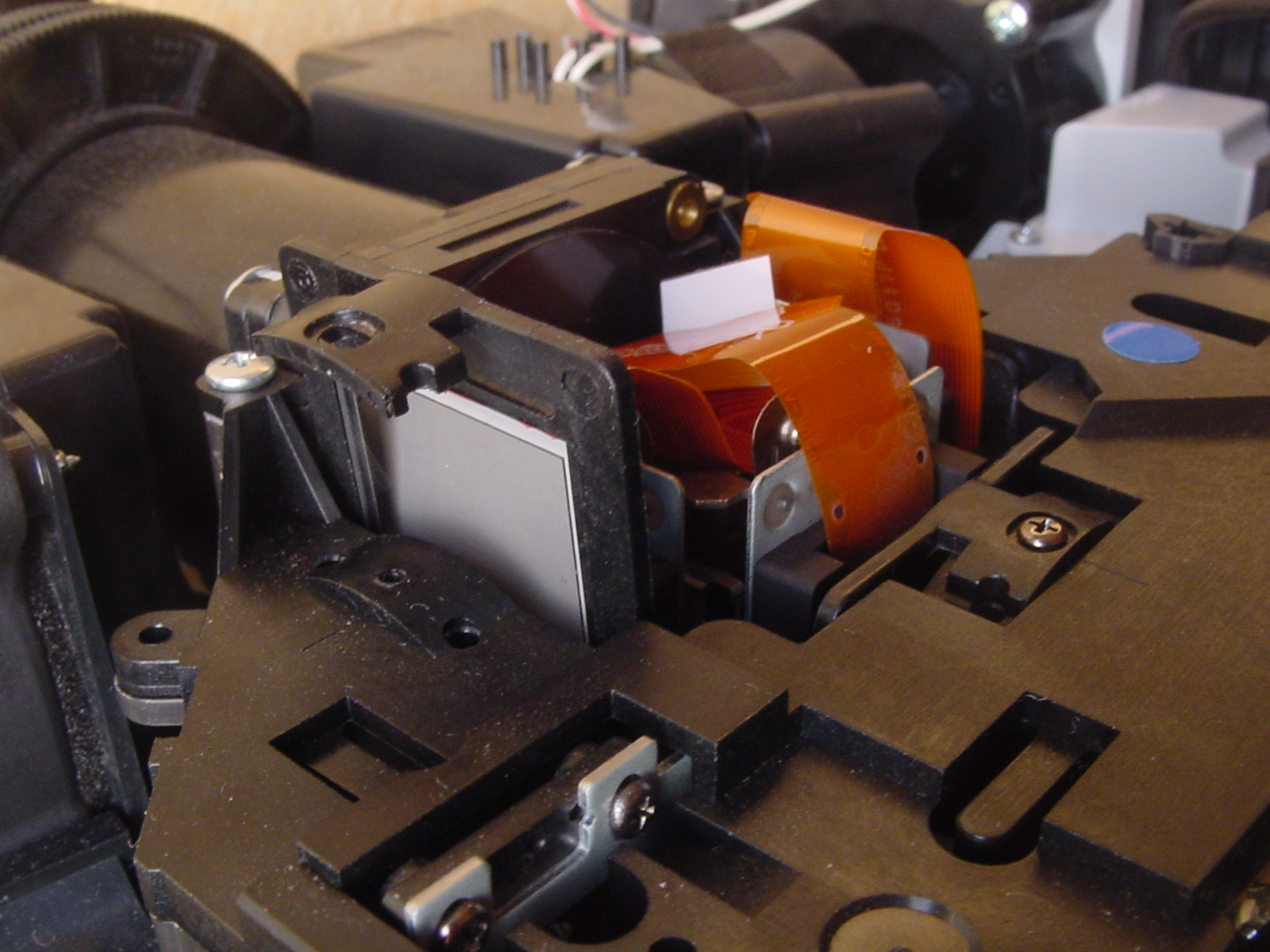
Typical 3LCDs (RGB) projector showing separated polarizers

At about the same time, the German company "Bonner Ingenieurbüro für Optoelektronik CrystalVision" started experimenting with LCD projection devices from 1985 onwards. Although traditional slide projectors already used infrared filters to reduce heating of the photographic slides, LCDs are much more sensitive to overheating. When the temperature in the nematic liquid crystal layer reaches the clearing point (i.e., enters the isotropic phase), the LC light valve does not work anymore until the temperature drops below again. Bernt Haastert, an engineer working at CrystalVision, found out, that placing the required polarizing filters at a certain distance on both sides of the LC cell allowed for efficient air cooling of the arrangement. Without applying this invention, LCD projectors with a powerful light source don't work. A commercial LCD projector based on this principle was launched in Germany in 1990 under the trade name "Imagina 90".

With patents filed worldwide (filing his first LCD video projector patent application in 1987), Dolgoff started Projectavision, Inc. in 1988, as one of the world's first dedicated LCD-projector companies, which he took public on Nasdaq in 1990. He licensed the technology to other companies, including Panasonic and Samsung. Early pioneers of LCD projection in Japan were Epson and Sharp, which launched their own color video projector products in 1989.

In 1989, Projectavision, Inc. was awarded the first Defense Advanced Research Projects Agency (DARPA) contract – for US$1 million – for proposing that the United States high-definition television (HDTV) standard should use digital processing and projection. As a member of the National Association of Photographic Manufacturers Standards Subcommittee, IT7-3, Dolgoff along with Leon Shapiro, co-developed the worldwide ANSI standard for measurement of brightness, contrast, and resolution of electronic projectors.

Since 2005, the only remaining manufacturers of the LCDs for LCD projectors are Japanese imaging companies Epson and Sony. Epson owns the technology and has branded it as "3LCD". To market 3LCD projector technology, Epson also set up a consortium called the "3LCD Group" in 2005 with other projector manufacturer licensees of 3LCD technology that use it in their projector models.

Early LCD systems were used with existing overhead projectors. The LCD system did not have a light source of its own: it was built on a large plate that sat on top of the projector in place of transparencies. This provided a stopgap solution in the era when the computer was not yet a universal display medium, creating a market for LCD projectors before their current main use became popular.

This technology was employed in some sizes of rear-projection television consoles when there was a cost advantage in mid-size sets (40- to 50-inch diagonal). In 2014, 60-inch 1080p flat panel televisions were less costly than a projector with 1080p native resolution. Projection systems were typically marketed as offering a diagonal image size of 100 to 300 inches.

In 2004 and 2005, LCD front projection began a comeback with the introduction of the dynamic iris and other modifications that have improved perceived contrast to levels similar to DLP.

The basic design of an LCD projector is frequently used by hobbyists who build their own DIY (do-it-yourself) projection systems. The basic technique is to combine a high color-rendering index (CRI) high-intensity discharge lamp (HID lamp) and ballast with a condenser and collector Fresnel lens, a single color LCD removed from a common computer display or electronic device and a triplet lens. This design can also be used in low-cost (around US$200) LCD projectors.

== See also ==
- Comparison of display technology
- 3LCD
- CRT projector
- Handheld projector
- Movie projector
