= List of Panasonic video projectors =

This is an incomplete list of Panasonic Projectors

== Home theater projectors ==
Front projection with a widescreen ratio for home use and budget.

Model	Release date	Maximum resolution	Aspect ratio	Screen size (Diagonal)	Lumens (ANSI)	Contrast	Light source	Display method	Inputs	Notes
PT-AE100	February 2002	858x484	16:9	200 in (508cm)	700	500:1	120W UHM Bulb	3LCD	Composite, S-Video, Component	
PT-AE200	February 2003	858x484	16:9	200 in (508cm)	700	700:1	120W UHM Bulb	3LCD	Composite, S-Video, Component, SCART	
PT-AE300	January 2003	960x540	16:9	200 in (508cm)	800	800:1	120W UHM Bulb	3LCD	Composite, S-Video, Component, SCART, VGA, DVI	
PT-AE500	January 2004	720p	16:9	200 in (508cm)	850	1,300:1	130W UHM Bulb	3LCD	Composite, S-Video, Component, SCART, VGA, DVI	Also known as PT-L500
PT-AE700	October 2004	720p	16:9	400 in (1016cm)	1000	2,000:1	130W UHM Bulb	3LCD	Composite, S-Video, Component, SCART, VGA, HDMI	
PT-AE900	September 2005	720p	16:9	400 in (1016cm)	1100	5,500:1	130W UHM Bulb	3LCD	Composite, S-Video, Component, SCART, VGA, HDMI	
PT-AX100	September 2006	720p	16:9	200 in (508cm)	2000	6,000:1	220W UHM Bulb	3LCD	Composite, S-Video, Component, VGA, HDMI	
PT-AX1000	November 2006	1080p	16:9	200 in (508cm)	1100	11,000:1	165W UHM Bulb	3LCD	Composite, S-Video, Component, SCART, VGA, HDMI x 2	SCART on the European (E) variant only
PT-AX200	October 2007	720p	16:9	200 in (508cm)	2000	6,000:1	220W UHM Bulb	3LCD	Composite, S-Video, Component, VGA, HDMI x 2	
PT-AX2000	November 2007	1080p	16:9	200 in (508cm)	1500	16,000:1	165W UHM Bulb	3LCD	Composite, S-Video, Component x 2, VGA, HDMI x 3	
PT-AX3000	October 2008	1080p	16:9	200 in (508cm)	1600	60,000:1	165W UHM Bulb	3LCD	Composite, S-Video, Component x 2, VGA, HDMI x 3	
PT-AX4000	October 2009	1080p	16:9	200 in (508cm)	1600	100,000:1	170W UHM Bulb	3LCD	Composite, S-Video, Component, VGA, HDMI x 3	
PT-AE7000	October 2011	1080p	16:9	300 in (762cm)	2000	300,000:1	200W UHM Bulb	3LCD	Composite, S-Video, Component, VGA, HDMI x 3	
PT-AE8000	September 2012	1080p	16:9	305 in (777cm)	2400	500,000:1	220W UHM Bulb	3LCD	Composite, S-Video, Component, VGA, HDMI x 3	
