= Screen goo =

Acrylic paint

Screen Goo is an acrylic paint designed by Goo Systems as a projection screen coating for the video projection industry.

The intention of the product is to replace fixed or adjustable projection screens in a front projection environment. The product has been formulated with a specific consistency and visual performance characteristics so that it can be painted onto a wall (or other suitable surface), and will reflect the light from a projector in a manner similar to a projection screen.

The product was first discussed by the company founder on the AVSForum before being released to the public in 2003.
