= List of CRT video projectors =

This is an incomplete list of front-projection CRT video projectors.

== List of CRT projectors ==
Name	Manufacturer	Dates of production	Tube size	Tube type	Liquid coupled	Tube focus type	Maximum resolution	Bandwidth	Scan rate	ANSI lumens	Peak lumens	Convergence	Layout	Notes
Videobeam 1000	Advent	1973	6 inches	LightGuide	No		480i				50	Analogue		Schmidt optics, with fixed curved aluminium coated screen. Approximately 500 were produced and sold in the Boston area
Videobeam 1000A	Advent	1975	9 inches	LightGuide	No		480i				50	Analogue		As Videobeam 1000, apart from the inclusion of an optional wired remote control and other minor changes included making the vertical curve of the screen deeper.
Videobeam 750	Advent	1977	5 inches		No		480i					Analogue		Budget version of the 1000A with smaller tubes also designed to work with a 6' lower gain more durable screen. Lower quality video electronics
Videobeam 750E	Advent	1977?	5 inches		No		480i					Analogue		Possibly the "European version" of the 750 for 220V mains.
Videobeam 125	Advent				No		480i							Schmidt optics. Rear projection unit.
Videobeam 225	Advent				No		480i							Schmidt optics. Front projection unit
Videobeam 710	Advent	1978			No		480i							
Videobeam 760	Advent			f/1.3 tube Schmidt style tube	No		480i							Schmidt optics
Videobeam 761	Advent			f/1.0 Schmidt style tube	No		480i				130			Schmidt optics
Videobeam Graphics	Ampro		6.5 inches		No				72 kHz		500			
Videobeam 1000	Ampro		6.5 inches		No						500			As videobeam 3000 without
1100	AmPro		7 inches	180CHB22	No	ES	480i	10 MHz			650	Analogue		
1200	AmPro		7 inches	MEC	No	ES	480p		31.5 kHz		650	Analogue		
1400	AmPro		7 inches	MEC	No	ES	480p				650	Digital		
1500	AmPro		7 inches	MEC	No	ES	480p				650	Digital		
2000D	AmPro		7 inches	Sony	No	ES		70 MHz	56 kHz	130		Digital		
2000G	AmPro		7 inches	Sony	No	ES		70 MHz	80 kHz	130		Digital		
2300	AmPro		7 inches	Sony	No	EM		70 MHz	90 kHz			Digital		
2600D	AmPro		7 inches	Sony	No	ES	1024 × 768	70 MHz	64 kHz	130	725	Digital		
2600G	AmPro		7 inches	Sony	No	ES	1600 × 1200	70 MHz	85 kHz	130	725	Digital		
3300	AmPro		8 inches	MEC	No	EM	1600 × 1200	100 MHz	90 kHz	210	850	Digital		
3400	AmPro		8 inches	MEC	No	EM	1600 × 1200	100 MHz	105 kHz		1000	Digital		
3600	AmPro		8 inches	MEC	No	EM	1600 × 1200	100 MHz	105 kHz		1000	Digital		
4000D	AmPro		9 inches	Sony	Yes	ES		70 MHz	56 kHz		1200	Digital		
4000G	AmPro		9 inches	Sony	Yes	ES		70 MHz	80 kHz		1000	Digital		
4200	AmPro		9 inches	Sony	Yes	EM		100 MHz	90 kHz		1000	Digital		
4300	AmPro		9 inches	MEC/Sony	Yes	EM	2500 × 2000	100 MHz	90 kHz		1100	Digital		
4600	AmPro	1996	9 inches	Sony	Yes	EM	2500 × 2000	100 MHz	105 kHz	270	1200	Digital		
Barco Vision	Barco	1983	7 inches	Clinton	No			10 MHz	15 kHz					
Vision Star 4	Barco	1983	7 inches	Clinton	No			10 MHz	15 kHz					
Barco Vision 2	Barco	1984	7 inches	Clinton	No			10 MHz	18 kHz					Small screens only
Barco Vision 2 LS	Barco	1984	7 inches	Clinton	No			10 MHz	18 kHz					
Barco Vision 2 DTAC	Barco	1985	7 inches	Clinton	No			10 MHz	18 kHz					
Vision Star 5 LS	Barco	1984	7 inches	Clinton	No			10 MHz	18 kHz					
Dual Vision 2	Barco	1985	7 inches	Clinton	No			10 MHz	18 kHz					Two projectors mounted in a special pedestal allowing twice the brightness.
Videacolor	Barco	1985	7 inches	SD-130	No			10 MHz	18 kHz					
Barco Vision Special Video	Barco	1985	7 inches	Clinton	No			10 MHz	15 kHz					
Dual Special Video	Barco	1985	7 inches	Clinton	No			10 MHz	15 kHz					Two projectors mounted in a special pedestal allowing twice the brightness. One projector can converge on green.
Special Video Mk2	Barco	1986	7 inches	Clinton	No			15 MHz	15 kHz					
Vision 1000	Barco	1987	9 inches	SD-146	Yes			15 MHz	15 kHz					
Vision 1500	Barco	1988	9 inches	SD-146	Yes			15 MHz	15 kHz					
Vision 400	Barco	1987	7 inches	SD-130	No			15 MHz	15 kHz					
Vision 600	Barco	1987	7 inches	SD-187	No			15 MHz	15 kHz					Various subversions of the projector were built designated S, HQ, C which differed in minor detail (lenses, etc).
Vision 1500 HDTV	Barco	1990	9 inches	SD-146	Yes			15 MHz	32 kHz					
Vision 1200 HD	Barco	1992	9 inches	09MX	Yes			80 MHz	66 kHz					
Vision 1600 HDTV	Barco	1992	9 inches	SD-146	Yes			30 MHz	35 kHz					
Vision 700	Barco	1992	7 inches	SD-187	No			20 MHz	35 kHz					A HQ variant was built with HD 6 lenses instead of TAC 3
Vision 700 Cine	Barco	1994	7 inches	SD07MS	No			20 MHz	15 kHz					
Vision 701	Barco	1994	7 inches	SD07MS	No			20 MHz	35 kHz					
Vision 701 Cine	Barco	1993	7 inches	SD07MS	No			20 MHz	15 kHz					several versions of the BV701 Cine were produced with Toshiba T180 tubes
Vision 701s	Barco	1995	7 inches	T180	No			20 MHz	35 kHz	145				
Vision 701 MM	Barco	1997	7 inches	T180	No			45 MHz	50 kHz					
Vision 1209 HD	Barco	1994	9 inches	2208	Yes			80 MHz	64 kHz	225				
Vision 1609 HD	Barco	1996	9 inches	19LCP07	Yes			60 MHz	64 kHz	270				
Vision 800 HD	Barco		8 inches	T180	No			35 MHz	50 kHz					
Graphics 400	Barco	1987	7 inches	SD130/SD187	No			100 MHz	72 kHz					
Data Graphics	Barco	1987	7 inches	SD130	No			70 MHz	64 kHz					
Graphics 1001	Barco	1988	9 inches	SD146	Yes			70 MHz	64 kHz					
Graphics 800	Barco	1989	8 inches	07MP	No			60 MHz	90 kHz					
Graphics 1200	Barco	1993	9 inches	PT22-08	Yes			120 MHz	135 kHz					
Graphics 500	Barco	1992	7 inches	SD-187	No			50 MHz	75 kHz					
Graphics 801	Barco	1993	8 inches	07MSP	No			75 MHz	92 kHz					
Graphics 1208	Barco	1994	8 inches	180DVB22	No			120 MHz	135 kHz	210				Later models had PT18-205 tubes.
Graphics 808	Barco	1994	8 inches	180DVB22	No			75 MHz	105 kHz	210				Later models had PT18-205 tubes.
Graphics 808s	Barco	1996	8 inches	07MFP2	No			120 MHz	110 kHz	210				Later models had PT18-205 tubes.
Graphics 1209	Barco	1994	9 inches	PT22-08	Yes			120 MHz	135 kHz	270				
Cine 7	Barco		7 inches	Toshiba T180	No	ES	1280 × 1024	75 MHz	69 kHz	180	1000	Digital		
Cine 8	Barco		8 inches	Matsushita P16LXV	Yes	EM	1600 × 1200	120 MHz	110 kHz	220	1100	Digital		
Cine 9	Barco		9 inches	Matsushita P19 LUG	Yes	EM	2500 × 2000	180 MHz	132 kHz	300	1200	Digital		
Dwin 500	Dwin		7 inches	Toshiba T180	No	EM		75 MHz	65 kHz		1100	Digital		No cooling fans.
Dwin 700	Dwin		7 inches	Toshiba; 36 mm neck	No	ES		75 MHz	65 kHz		1100	Digital		
XS2000HT	Ellie		7 inches	Panasonic	No		1024 × 768	40 MHz	52 kHz	250	1300	Analogue		
XS3000HT	Ellie		7 inches	Sony OM7	No			40 MHz	52 kHz	270	1500	Digital		
ECP 1000	Electrohome	1983	7 inches	SD187	No	ES	480p	30 MHz	33 kHz		725			
ECP 2000	Electrohome	1984	7 inches	SD136	No	ES	540p	30 MHz	36 kHz		725			Internal prism focus system with a single projection lens.
ECP 2100	Electrohome	1991	7 inches	SD187	No	ES	540p	30 MHz	36 kHz		600			
ECP 2500	Electrohome		7 inches	07MS	No	ES	1024 × 768	50 MHz	50 kHz		725			
ECP 2500 Plus	Electrohome		7 inches	07MS	No	ES	1024 × 768	50 MHz	50 kHz	150	1005			S-video input
ECP 3000	Electrohome	1988	7 inches	SD187	No	ES	1280 × 1024	60 MHz	50 kHz		650			
ECP 3100 ECP 3101	Electrohome	1991	7 inches	SD187	No	ES	1280 × 1024	50 MHz	55 kHz		600			
ECP 3500 ECP 3501	Electrohome		7 inches	07MS	No	ES	1280 × 1024	60 MHz	62 kHz		725			
ECP 3500 Plus	Electrohome		7 inches	07MS	No	ES	1280 × 1024	60 MHz	72 kHz	150	1005			
ECP 4000	Electrohome	1988	7 inches	SD187	No	ES	1280 × 1024	65 MHz	80 kHz		600	Digital		
ECP 4100	Electrohome	1991	7 inches	SD187	No	ES	1280 × 1024	70 MHz	80 kHz		650	Digital		
ECP 4500 ECP 4501	Electrohome		7 inches	07MS	No	ES	1280 × 1024	70 MHz	90 kHz		725	Digital		
ECP 4500 Plus	Electrohome		7 inches	07MS	No	ES	1280 × 1024	70 MHz	90 kHz	150	1005	Digital		
EDP 56	Electrohome	1978			No				24 kHz					Monochrome data display
EDP 57	Electrohome	1982			No		480p	30 MHz	33 kHz		725			Monochrome data display
EDP 58	Electrohome				No		480p	30 MHz	33 kHz		725			Monochrome data display
EDP 58XL	Electrohome				No		480p	20 MHz	33 kHz		500			Monochrome data display
ECP Graphics	Electrohome	1983	7 inches	SD187	No	ES	1024 × 768	30 MHz	80 kHz		500			
Marquee 6500	Electrohome		8 inches	180DMB22	No	ES	1600 × 1200	70 MHz	80 kHz		900	Digital		
Marquee 7500	Electrohome		8 inches	180DMB22	No	EM	1600 × 1200	100 MHz	110 kHz		900	Digital		
Marquee 8000	Electrohome	1993	8 inches	180DMB22	No	EM	1600 × 1200	100 MHz	130 kHz		1000	Digital		
Marquee 8110	Electrohome	1995	8 inches	180DMB22	No	EM	1600 × 1200	100 MHz	110 kHz	210	1000	Digital		
Marquee 8500SM	Electrohome	1997	8 inches	180DMB22	No	EM	1600 × 1200	120 MHz	70 kHz	225	1000	Digital		Simulator version
Marquee 8500	Electrohome	1995	8 inches	180DMB22	No	EM	1600 × 1200	100 MHz	130 kHz	225	1000	Digital		
Marquee 8500LC	Electrohome	1995	8 inches	180DMB22	Yes	EM	1600 × 1200	100 MHz	130 kHz	235	1200	Digital		
Marquee 9000	Electrohome	1993	9 inches	P19LCP09	Yes	EM	2500 × 2000	120 MHz	130 kHz		1200	Digital		
Marquee 9500DM	Electrohome	1997	9 inches	P19LCP09	Yes	EM	2500 × 2000	120 MHz	70 kHz	260	1300	Digital		Simulator model
Marquee 9500LC	Electrohome	1995	9 inches	P19LCP09	Yes	EM	2500 × 2000	120 MHz	130 kHz	260	1300	Digital		
Marquee 9500HS	Electrohome		9 inches	P19LCP09	Yes	EM	2500 × 2000	130 MHz	152 kHz		1300	Digital		
Marquee 9500LC Ultra	Electrohome	1998	9 inches	P19LCP09	Yes	EM	2500 × 2000	130 MHz	152 kHz		1300	Digital		
Cinema Super Color 9000	Grundig	1979			No									
DP-1200	NEC		8 inches		Yes	EM	540p/1080i	30 MHz	36 kHz		475	Digital		
DP-5200	NEC		8 inches		No	EM	540p/1080i	30 MHz	36 kHz					
GP-3000	NEC		8 inches	95R656	No	EM	1024×768	50 MHz	55 kHz		600	Digital		
GP-5000	NEC		9 inches		Yes	EM	1280 × 1024	70 MHz	75 kHz		650	Digital		
6PG	NEC	1992	8 inches	E8508	No	EM	1280 × 1024	70 MHz	61.5 kHz		800	Digital (opt.)		
6PG Plus	NEC	1994	8 inches	E8508	No	EM	1280 × 1024	75 MHz	65 kHz		850	Digital (opt.)		
6PG Xtra	NEC	1995	8 inches	P16JLE	No	EM	1280 × 1024	80 MHz	69 kHz		1000	Digital (opt.)		
9PG	NEC	1992	8 inches	E8508	No	EM	1600 × 1200	70 MHz	93 kHz		800	Digital		
9PG Plus	NEC	1994	8 inches	E8508	No	EM	1600 × 1200	75 MHz	93 kHz		850	Digital (opt.)		
9PG Xtra	NEC	1995	8 inches	P16JLE	No	EM	1600 × 1200	100 MHz	100 kHz		1000	Digital		
10PG	NEC	1992	9 inches	9515631	Yes	EM	1600 × 1200	70 MHz	92 kHz		1000	Digital		
XG-750	NEC	1996	8 inches	PJ16LJE06, PJ16LJE07, PJ16LJE08	No	EM	1600 × 1200	110 MHz	75 kHz		1100	Digital		
XG-751	NEC	1997	8 inches	PJ16LJE06, PJ16LJE07, PJ16LJE08	No	EM	1600 × 1200	110 MHz	75 kHz		1100	Digital		
XG-852	NEC	1998	8 inches	PJ16LJE06, PJ16LJE07, PJ16LJE08	No	EM	1600 × 1200	110 MHz	85 kHz		1100	Digital		
XG-1100	NEC	1996	8 inches	PJ16LJE06, PJ16LJE07, PJ16LJE08	No	EM	2500 × 2000	120 MHz	110 kHz		1100	Digital		
XG-1101	NEC	1997	8 inches	PJ16LJE06, PJ16LJE07, PJ16LJE08	Yes	EM	2500 × 2000	120 MHz	110 kHz		1100	Digital		
XG-1350	NEC	1996	8 inches	PJ16LJE06, PJ16LJE07, PJ16LJE08	No	EM	2500 × 2000	150 MHz	135 kHz		1100	Digital		
XG-1351	NEC	1997	8 inches	PJ16LJE06, PJ16LJE07, PJ16LJE08	Yes	EM	2500 × 2000	150 MHz	135 kHz		1100	Digital		
XG-1352	NEC	1998	8 inches	PJ16LJE06, PJ16LJE07, PJ16LJE08	Yes	EM	2500 × 2000	150 MHz	135 kHz		1100	Digital		
CT-6000	Panasonic	1978			No									Front "mirror" projection system with 60-inch (1,500 mm) screen
1083	Panasonic	1995	8 inches	180DYB22	No	ES	1500	75 MHz	70 kHz		850	Digital		
1085	Panasonic	1995	8 inches	180DYB22	No	ES	1600 × 1200	90 MHz	100 kHz		850	Digital		
PT-101	Panasonic	1985	7 inches		No		480i				450			
PT-102	Panasonic				No									
PT-105	Panasonic		8 inches	180DYB22	Yes				37 kHz		550			Available as 72 or 120-inch (3,000 mm) model
PT-106	Panasonic		8 inches	180DYB22	Yes				37 kHz		550			Available as 72 or 120-inch (3,000 mm) model
PT-200	Panasonic	1990	7 inches		Yes				36 kHz		550			
PT-301	Panasonic		7 inches		No						450			
PT-302	Panasonic				No									
SVT 110	Seleco		7 inches	Toshiba	No	ES	480i	7 MHz	16 kHz	110	680	Analogue		
SVT 120	Seleco		7 inches	Toshiba	No	ES		7 MHz	16 kHz	110	680	Analogue		
SVT 130	Seleco		7 inches	Toshiba	No	ES		7 MHz	16 kHz	110	680	Analogue		
SVT 150	Seleco		7 inches	Toshiba	No	ES		7 MHz	16 kHz	110	680	Analogue		
SVT 180	Seleco		7 inches	Sony SD-187 or 07MS	No	ES		7 MHz	16 kHz	140	900	Analogue		
SVT 190	Seleco		7 inches	Sony 07MS	No	ES		7 MHz	16 kHz	140	900	Analogue		
SVT 190	Seleco		7 inches	Sony SD-187	No	ES		7 MHz	16 kHz	140	900	Digital		
SVT 195CT	Seleco		7 inches	Sony SD-187	No	ES		7 MHz	16 kHz		900	Digital		
SVT 195MT	Seleco		7 inches	Sony SD-187	No	ES		7 MHz	16 kHz		900	Digital		
SVT 220	Seleco		7 inches	SD-187	No	ES						Digital		
SVP 310	Seleco		7 inches	Toshiba	No	ES	480i	12 MHz	16 kHz	130	800	Analogue		
SVP 320	Seleco		7 inches	Toshiba	No	ES	480i	12 MHz	16 kHz	130	800	Analogue		
SVP 320 Plus	Seleco		7 inches	Toshiba	No	ES	480i	12 MHz	16 kHz	130		Analogue		
SVP 350	Seleco		7 inches	Toshiba	No	ES	480i	12 MHz	16 kHz	130	800	Analogue		
SVP 350 Plus	Seleco		7 inches	Sony/Toshiba	No	ES	640 × 480	12 MHz	16 kHz	130		Analogue		
SVP 390 Plus	Seleco		7 inches	Sony 07MS	No	ES	640 × 480	12 MHz	16 kHz	140	900	Digital		
SVP 400 HT	Seleco		7 inches	Sony 07MS	No	ES	640 × 480	20 MHz	32 kHz	140	900	Digital		
SVP 400 Plus	Seleco		7 inches	Sony 07MS	No	ES	640 × 480	20 MHz	32 kHz	140	900	Digital		
SVP 420 HB	Seleco		7 inches	Sony 07MS	No	ES	640 × 480	20 MHz	38 kHz	140	900	Digital		
SVP 450	Seleco		7 inches	Sony 07MS	No	ES	640 × 480	20 MHz	38 kHz		950	Digital		
SVP 450 Plus	Seleco		7 inches	Sony 07MS	No	ES	640 × 480	20 MHz	38 kHz	145	950	Digital		
SDP 500 Plus	Seleco		7 inches	Sony 07MS	No	ES	640 × 480	20 MHz	38 kHz	145	950	Digital		
SDP 500 Plus HD	Seleco		7 inches	Sony 07MS	No	ES	640 × 480	20 MHz	38 kHz	145	950	Digital		
SVD 500 HT	Seleco		7 inches	Sony 07MS	No	ES	640 × 480	20 MHz	38 kHz	140	900	Digital		
SVD 700	Seleco		7 inches		No	ES				190		Digital		
SVD 800 HD	Seleco	1999	7 inches		No	ES	1280 × 1024	75 MHz	72 kHz	190	1050	Digital		
SVD 800 Millennium	Seleco	2000	7 inches		No	ES	1280 × 1024	75 MHz	72 kHz		1050	Digital		
SDG 700	Seleco		7 inches		No	ES	1500		72 kHz	160		Digital		
SDG 790	Seleco		7 inches		No	ES	1500		90 kHz	160		Digital		
SDG 900	Seleco		8 inches		No	ES	1600 × 1200		105 kHz	250	1200	Digital		
SDG 900 Plus	Seleco		8 inches		No	ES	1600 × 1200		105 kHz	230	1200	Digital		
KP-5000	Sony	1978			No		480i				50	Analogue		50 inch fixed screen projector with two projector lenses with three tubes. 60 fL on screen brightness.
KP-7200	Sony	1978			No		480i				50	Analogue		72 inch fixed screen projector with two projector lenses with crt three tubes. 30 fL on screen brightness.
KP-5010	Sony	1979			No		480i					Analogue		50 inch screen projector
KP-7210	Sony	1979			No		480i					Analogue		72 inch screen projector
KP-5020	Sony	1980			No		480i					Analogue		50 inch screen projector. Two piece unit
KP-7220	Sony	1980			No		480i					Analogue		72 inch screen projector. Two piece unit.
KP-5025	Sony	1982			No		480i					Analogue		50 inch screen projector
KP-7225	Sony	1982		SD-116	No		480i					Analogue		72 inch screen projector
KP-5030	Sony				No		480i					Analogue		50 inch screen projector
KP-7230	Sony				No		480i					Analogue		72 inch screen projector
KP-5040	Sony				No		480i					Analogue		50 inch screen projector
KP-7240	Sony				No		480i					Analogue		72 inch screen projector
Vidimagic FP-60	Sony	1984			No									Portable color single tube projector with integrated Betamax VCR
Vidimagic FP-62	Sony	1984			No									Portable color single tube projector.
VPH-600	Sony	1987	7 inches	SD-130	No	ES	480i	10 MHz	15.75 kHz		300	Analogue		
VPH-720	Sony		7 inches	SD-130	No	ES	480i	10 MHz	15.75 kHz		300	Analogue		
VPH-722	Sony		7 inches	SD-130	No	ES	480i	10 MHz	15.75 kHz		300	Analogue		
VPH-1000	Sony		7 inches	SD-187	No	ES	480i	10 MHz	15.75 kHz		500	Analogue		
VPH-1001	Sony		7 inches	07MS	No	ES	480i	10 MHz	15.75 kHz		700	Analogue		
VPH-1020	Sony		7 inches	SD-130	No	ES	480i	10 MHz	15.75 kHz		700	Analogue		
VPH-1030 VPH-2030	Sony		7 inches	SD-130	No	ES	480p	15 MHz	32 kHz		300	Analogue		VPH-2030 is the wide throw version of the projector for 200-inch (5,100 mm) diagonal image.
VPH-1031	Sony	1987	7 inches	SD-187 (B); SD-130 (R, G)	No	ES	540p	30 MHz	36 kHz		500	Analogue		
VPH-1040	Sony		7 inches	SD-187	No	ES	480i	10 MHz	15.75 kHz		500	Analogue		
VPH-1041	Sony		7 inches	SD-130	No	ES	480i	10 MHz	15.75 kHz		500	Analogue		
VPH-1042	Sony		7 inches	SD-130	No	ES	480i	10 MHz	15.75 kHz		600	Analogue		With color corrected lenses
VPH-1043	Sony		7 inches	SD-130	No	ES	480i	10 MHz	15.75 kHz		500	Analogue		
VPH-1044	Sony	1994	7 inches	07MS	No	ES	480i	10 MHz	15.75 kHz		700	Analogue		
VPH-1251	Sony	1991	8 inches	07MP	No	ES	1024 × 768	40 MHz	58 kHz	200	650	Digital		
VPH-1252	Sony		8 inches	07MSP	No	ES	1024 × 768	40 MHz	61.5 kHz	200	700	Digital		
HDIR-550	Sony	1993	7 inches	HACC	Yes	EM	800	30 MHz	35 kHz	100	200			Part of the Sony HDVS early HDTV Rear Projector 55-inch diagonally
HDIH-1200	Sony	1993	9 inches	Impre-cathode LC2 (Liquid Coupling and Cooling System)	Yes			30 MHz	35 kHz	100	300	Digital		Part of the Sony HDVS early HDTV. Displays from 100-150-inch diagonally
HDIH-2000	Sony	1993	9 inches	Impre-cathode LC2 (Liquid Coupling and Cooling System)	Yes	EM	1000	30 MHz	35 kHz	100	300	Digital		Part of the Sony HDVS early HDTV. Displays 150-220-inch diagonally
HDIH-2400	Sony				No		1000	30 MHz						Part of the Sony HDVS early HDTV
HDIH-3000	Sony	1993	9 inches	Impre-cathode LC2 (Liquid Coupling and Cooling System)	Yes	EM	1000	30 MHz	35 kHz		300			Part of the Sony HDVS early HDTV. Displays 220-350-inch diagonally, stackable with HDIT-3000W Projection Head Stand, peak white 300 lumens, all white:260 lumens
VPH-1270Q	Sony	1990	8 inches	07MP	No	ES	1280 × 1024	40 MHz	75 kHz		650	Digital		
VPH-1271Q	Sony	1991	8 inches	07MP	No	ES	1600 × 1200	75 MHz	85 kHz	200	650	Digital		
VPH-1272Q	Sony	1995	8 inches	07MP	No	ES	1600 × 1200	85 MHz	93 kHz	200	700	Digital		
VPH-1292Q	Sony	1995	9 inches	09MFX3	Yes	EM	2000	120 MHz	135 kHz	225	700+	Digital		
VPH-V20M	Sony	1998	7 inches		No	EM		75 MHz	64 kHz	100	700	Digital		
VPH-D50Q VPH-D50HTU	Sony	1997	7 inches	P14LKJ03	No	EM	1280 × 1024	75 MHz	64 kHz		800	Digital		
VPH-G70Q	Sony	1997	8 inches	P16LJE08	Yes	EM	1600 × 1200			200	700	Digital		
VPH-G90U	Sony	1997	9 inches	P19LQF6	Yes	EM	2500 × 2000	135 MHz	150 kHz	350	1300	Digital		
Novabeam Model One	Kloss	1979	6.5 inches	Novatron	No	Fixed magnet	480i				175			Schmidt optics NovaTron tube. Horizontal three tubes in a row configuration.
Novabeam Model One-A	Kloss	1982	6.5 inches	NovaTron	No	Fixed magnet					200			Enhanced version of Model One with an IR remote control. Versions were available that could project a 10-foot (3.0 m) picture and could be ceiling mounted.
Novabeam Model Two	Kloss	1982	6.5 inches	NovaTron	No	Fixed magnet					200			Vertical configuration, with a periscope like mirror. Projects onto a wall a 5'4" image.
Novabeam Model Three	Kloss	1983	6.5 inches	NovaTron	No	Fixed magnet					200			Schmidt optics
Novabeam Model 100	Kloss			NovaTron	No			9 MHz			250			Schmidt optics. Horizontal tube configuration. Flat or curved screen.
Videobeam 2000	Kloss	1985		NovaTron II	No			15 MHz	15.9 kHz		250			
Videobeam 3000	Kloss	1987			No			17 MHz	34 kHz		300			Later sold as Ampro Videobeam 1000
Hi-beam CX1	Videpro	1985	7 inches		No			15 MHz	28 kHz		550	Analogue		Marketed by Bell & Howell. Produced by Videpro in Ireland
Hi-beam CX2	Videpro	1988	7 inches		No			40 MHz	36.5 kHz		550	Analogue		Marketed by Bell & Howell. Produced by Videpro in Ireland
Hi-beam 450	Videpro				No							Analogue		Marketed by Bell & Howell.
Hi-beam 550	Videpro				No							Analogue		Marketed by Bell & Howell.
Hi-beam 550	Videpro				No							Analogue		Marketed by Bell & Howell.
VT2000	Maxivideo				No						600			
DMP1000	Maxivideo				No									
DMP2000	Maxivideo				No									
PRO 800	Zenith				No									
PRO 810	Zenith				No									
PRO 820	Zenith				No									
PRO 830	Zenith				No									
PRO 840	Zenith				No									
PRO 841X	Zenith		7 inches	180CHB22	No	ES	480i	10 MHz	15.75 kHz		650	Analogue		
PRO 851X	Zenith		7 inches	180CHB22	No	ES	480i	10 MHz	15.75 kHz		650	Analogue		No RGB input
PRO 880X	Zenith	1993	7 inches	MEC	Yes	ES	480i	10 MHz	15.75 kHz		700	Analogue		No RGB input
PRO 881X	Zenith	1993	7 inches	MEC	Yes	ES	480i	10 MHz	15.75 kHz		700	Analogue		No RGB input
PRO 895X	Zenith		7 inches	MEC	Yes	ES	1024 × 768	37.5 MHz	40 kHz		700	Digital		
PRO 900X	Zenith	1993	7 inches	MEC	Yes	ES	1024 × 768	37.5 MHz	50 kHz		800	Digital		
PRO 1200X	Zenith	2001	8 inches	P16LNP	Yes	EM	1600 × 1200	75 MHz	75 kHz		1250	Digital		Rebadged Barco Cine 8 Onyx
PRO 2000X	Zenith		7 inches	P16LKE02	No	EM	1600 × 1200	75 MHz	100 kHz		1250	Digital		Rebadged Toshiba P7300U

== Re-badged projectors ==
A number of projector manufacturers produced projectors that were sold under the brand of different makers, sometimes with minor electrical or cosmetic modification. The following list reflects these re-badged projectors.

Re-badger	Model	Manufacturer	Original model	Notes
Accurate	8 & 9	Electrohome	Marquee	
ITT	Cinevision	Kloss	various	
Harman/Kardon	VPM 500	Kloss	Novabeam 100	
Harman/Kardon	VPM 600	Kloss		
Vidikron	various	Electrohome	various	
Runco	various	Matsushita/Zenith/NEC/Barco	various	Some modifications for home theatre market, line doublers and colored glycol coolant
GE	various	Panasonic/Zenith/NEC	various	
