= Throw (projector) =

Video projection term

In video projection terminology, throw is the distance between a video projector lens and the screen on which it shines. It is given as a ratio (called throw ratio), which describes the relationship between the distance to the screen and the width of the screen (assuming the image is to fill the screen fully). Throw ratio is a characteristic of the lens of the projector (although "projector throw" and "lens throw" are often used synonymously). Some projectors (typically larger, more expensive ones) are able to accept a variety of lenses, while lower cost projectors tend to have a permanent lens which is not designed to be changed. Some lenses are fixed at a specific throw ratio, while most are adjustable (zoomable) to a range of throw ratios. Distance to the screen is measured from the front of the lens.

== Formula ==
Distance (D), Width (W), Throw Ratio (R)

If the distance and width are known, calculate the throw ratio using the formula: R = D / W

If the screen width and throw ratio are known, calculate the distance using the equivalent formula: D = W x R

Although it is often stated as a single value (or range of values), throw ratio is a comparison of D : W. To reduce this to a single number (as is typically seen in projector/lens specifications), start by dividing both sides by W, resulting in D / W : 1. The 1 on the right means "for each one unit of width of the screen, how many units away should the projector be?" In practice the 1 is often assumed (omitted) when listing this specification.

== Examples (fixed lenses) ==
A video projector (lens) with a throw ratio of 2.0 (or 2.0 : 1) would need to be positioned at a distance that is twice the width of the screen. If the screen is 60" wide, the projector needs to be 120" from the screen. Each dimension can also be given in feet, meters, or centimeters, as long as both measurements are in the same units.

A video projector (lens) with a throw ratio of 0.4 or less would be positioned relatively close to the screen, and would be considered a "short throw projector".

A video projector that must be positioned very far from the screen would need a "long throw lens" with a throw ratio like 7.5.

== Zoom lenses ==
While some lenses have a fixed throw ratio (as in the examples above), most are adjustable. This is referred to as a zoom lens, and the throw ratio is given as a range (e.g. 1.2 - 3.0). This provides flexibility in positioning the projector, since the lens can be adjusted to accommodate any throw ratio within that range.

EXAMPLE: A video projector with a throw ratio of 1.2 - 3.0 is to be used on a screen that is 100" wide. Starting with the smaller value, we use the formula above (D = W x R, or D = 100 x 1.2) to determine that the closest position possible is 120". The furthest position for this projector is then 300". Installing this projector anywhere within the range of 120" to 300" from the screen will cause it to fill (by adjusting the zoom setting on the lens).

CAUTION: In some projector/lens specifications, the ability of a lens to adjust (zoom) its throw ratio is given as yet another ratio. This can be a source of confusion. For the above example, a manufacturer might say the lens has a zoom ratio of 2.5 (3.0 / 1.2 = 2.5), or a "2.5:1 zoom lens". A greater zoom ratio means that the lens is able to adjust more, but it says nothing about the specific throw ratios the lens is designed for. Another lens with a throw ratio range of 2.4 - 6.0 would have the exact same zoom ratio as the previous example. The "zoom ratio" is more useful for marketing purposes, while the actual "throw ratios" are necessary for designing a projection system. In some cases, the term "zoom ratio" is not used, which can contribute to confusion. If a single value is given (not a range of values) and the lens is capable of zooming, the value is likely the zoom ratio. A relatively small percentage of lenses have no zoom capability (fixed lenses), so their actual throw ratio would be given as a single value.

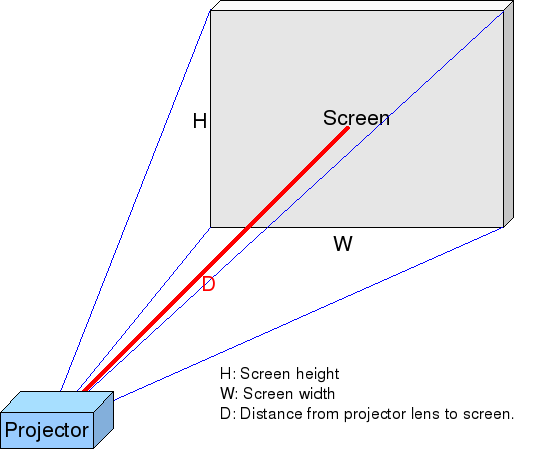
