= Gain (projection screens) =

Gain is a property of a projection screen and is one of the specifications quoted by projection screen manufacturers.

== Interpretation ==
The measured number is called the peak gain at zero degrees viewing axis. It represents the gain value for a viewer seated along a line perpendicular to the screen's viewing surface. The gain value represents the screen's brightness ratio relative to a set standard (in this case, a sheet of magnesium carbonate). Screens with a higher brightness than this standard are rated with a gain higher than 1.0, while screens with lower brightness are rated from 0.0 to 1.0. Since a projection screen is designed to scatter the impinging light back to the viewers, the scattering can be highly diffuse or highly concentrated. Highly concentrated scatter results in a higher screen gain (a brighter image) at the cost of a more limited viewing angle (as measured by the half-gain viewing angle), whereas highly diffuse scattering results in lower screen gain (a dimmer image) with the benefit of a wider viewing angle.

== Sources ==
- Powell, Evan (May 24, 2004). "What is screen gain?". Projector Central.
