= CRT projector =

Video projector using cathode ray tube

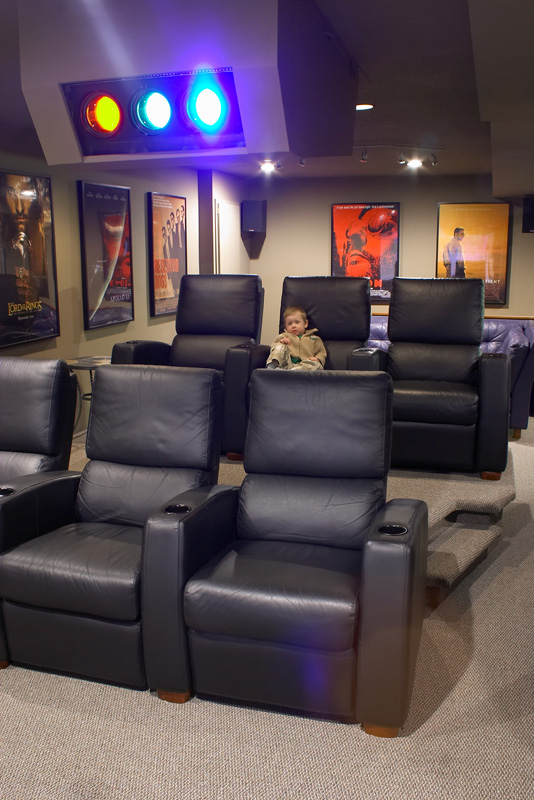
A Zenith 1200 CRT Projector based home theater. Visible extending from the ceiling are three lenses, one each for red, green and blue

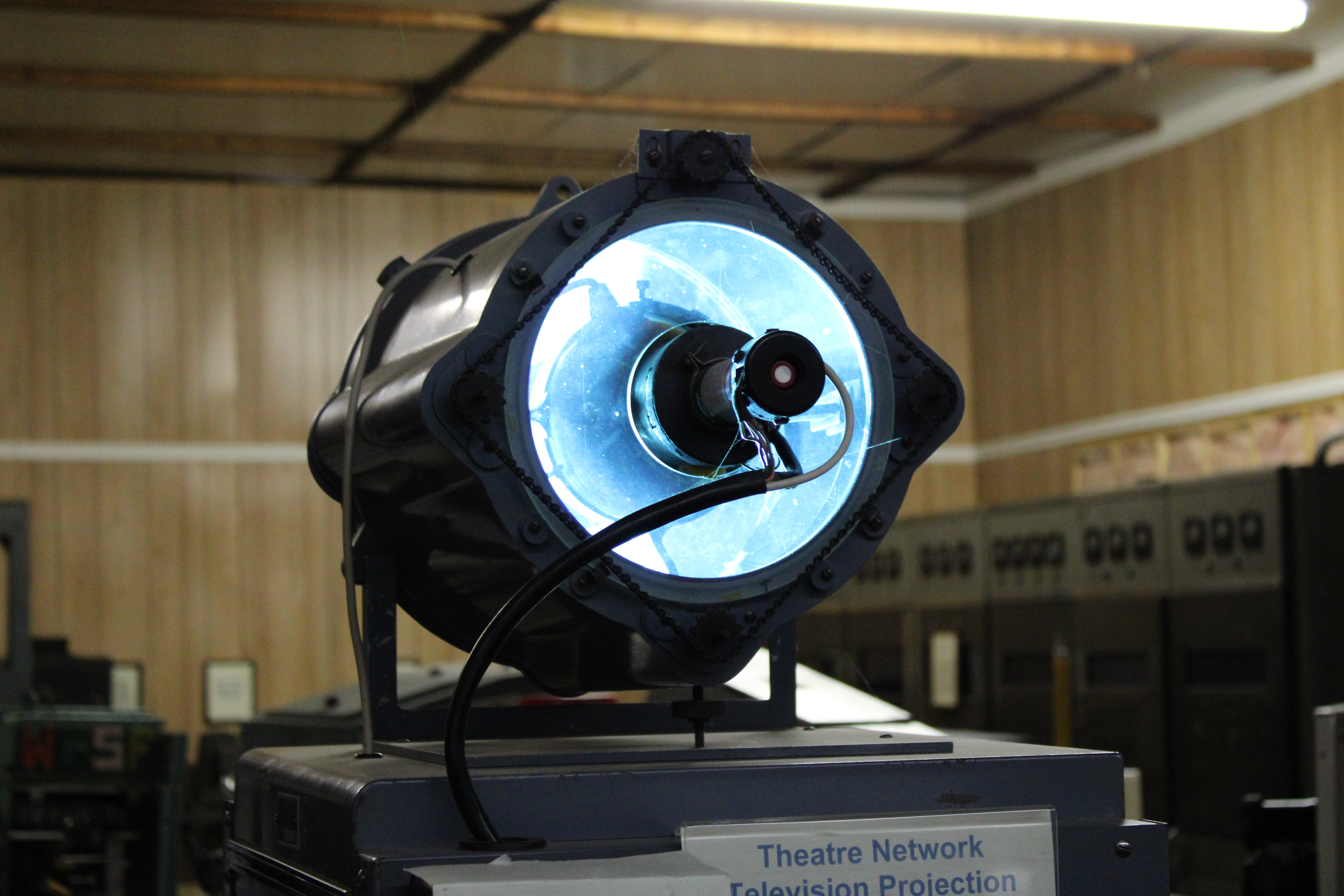
Black and white CRT projector

A CRT projector is a video projector that uses a small, high-brightness cathode-ray tube (CRT) as the image-generating element. The image is then focused and enlarged onto a screen using a lens kept in front of the CRT face. The first color CRT projectors came out in the early 1950s. Most modern CRT projectors are color and have three separate CRTs (instead of a single, color CRT), and their own lenses to achieve color images. The red, green and blue portions of the incoming video signal are processed and sent to the respective CRTs whose images are focused by their lenses to achieve the overall picture on the screen. Various designs have made it to production, including the "direct" CRT-lens design, and the Schmidt CRT, which employed a phosphor screen that illuminates a perforated spherical mirror, all within an evacuated CRT.

The image in the Sinclair Microvision flat CRT is viewed from the same side of the phosphor struck by the electron beam. The other side of the screen can be connected directly to a heat sink, allowing the projector to run at much brighter power levels than the more common CRT arrangement.

Though video projection systems at one time almost exclusively used CRT projectors, they have largely been replaced by other technologies such as LCD projection and Digital Light Processing. Improvements in these digital video projectors, and their subsequent increased availability and desirability, resulted in a drastic decline of CRT projector sales by the year 2009. As of 2012, very few (if any) new units are manufactured, though a number of installers do sell refurbished units, generally higher-end 8- and 9-inch models.

Some of the first CRT projection tubes were made in 1933, and by 1938, CRT projectors were already in use in theaters.

== Advantages and disadvantages ==
=== Advantages ===
- Long service life; CRTs maintain good brightness to 10,000 hours, although this depends on the contrast adjustment setting of the projector. A projector that is set to a lower maximum brightness will generally last longer.
- No bulbs to replace after only a couple thousand hours (as with xenon-backlit DLP and LCD); however, CRT projectors can accumulate burn-in if set to a high contrast value and/or displaying static content over time
- High-end CRT projectors can precisely display images up to 1920 x 1200. The Barco 912 claims an addressable resolution of 3200 x 2560, but with a bandwidth of 180 MHz it is not able to resolve fine detail at this resolution with the same clarity as other display technologies would, without lowering the refresh rate or enabling interlacing.
- Because of the good black levels, CRT projectors are good contenders to be used in edge-blend setups. DLP and LCD projector edge blend setups show a visible gray seam in the middle in dark scenes. Because of their 4:3 picture tubes, edge-blended CRTs use a larger surface area of the tubes when showing video in a cinemascope aspect ratio, which reduces uneven wear and yields higher total brightness. CRT projector stacking is also possible.
- Superior overall black level compared to LCD- and DLP-based projectors; however, some smaller air-coupled CRT projectors exhibit an effect known as blooming or haloing around bright objects displayed on a dark background
- As with CRT monitors, the image resolution and the refresh rate are not fixed but variable within some limits. Interlaced material can be played directly, without need for imperfect deinterlacing mechanisms.
- Zero input lag and zero motion blur, which makes them very suitable for video games of all kinds, as well video with fast motion (for example football or other sports)
- Many CRT projectors are multiscan-capable, with a horizontal frequency range starting at 15 KHz in the bottom end, on some projectors going all the way up to 150 or 180 KHz. This means that CRT projectors are resolution compatible with a lot of video sources, including standard-definition TV and retro games (15.7 KHz), VCRs, arcade games (15.7, 24 and 31 KHz), older VGA computers (31 KHz), modern computers (typically 48 KHz for 768p60, 68 KHz for 768p85, 67 KHz for 1080p60 or 137 KHz for 4k60), HDTV (45 KHz for 720p60, 28 KHz for 1080i50, 67 KHz for 1080p60), modern video game consoles, and more, without the need for upscaling or downscaling. This is advantageous over for example CRT computer monitors, of which all the ones from the mid-90s or later are also multisync capable, but have a lower frequency limit of 30 KHz, making 480p60 or 240p120 the lowest resolution possible, thus needing upscaling to work with retro games and arcade games.
- CRT projectors do not show a rainbow effect seen with single chip DLP projectors.
- CRT projectors are made of three separate monochrome picture tubes, aimed, focused, converged on the same screen, thus there is no screen-door effect whatsoever (however a properly set up CRT projector showing a small resolution (for example 240p as used in older video games) is able to show distinctly sharp scan lines with black areas in between
- Some CRT projectors, like the Dwin 500 and 700, include no fans and are much quieter than comparable LCD or DLP projectors. Many CRT projectors feature large-size fans and temperature control and some can be easily modified for quieter and/or better performing cooling. The components in CRT projectors feature large surface areas compared to compact, bright Xenon-bulb lit DLP or LCD projectors.
- Three separate lenses reduce the risk of running into chromatic aberration problems in the corners of the picture, because each lens can be adjusted separately to account for three different wavelengths

=== Disadvantages ===
- CRT projectors are both considerably larger and heavier than comparable LCD and DLP projectors.
- CRT projectors require far more time to set up and adjust than LCD and DLP based projectors.
- Absolute ANSI brightness achievable with CRT projectors is lower than with comparable lamp or laser illuminated LCD, LcOS and DLP projectors. As an example, the brightest CRT projectors for home use were capable of 1,500 ANSI lumens. In contrast, as of 2020 projectors for home use are capable of 2,600 or more lumens. However, brightness and contrast is measured differently between different types of projectors. In addition, some users find overly bright images uncomfortable to watch, and therefore choose to adjust the lamp output power to a lower value. While maximum achievable brightness is lower on a CRT projector, a CRT's contrast ratio makes it easier to adjust contrast/brightness settings without getting a washed out picture from a lamp that is unnecessarily powerful. Bright projectors are suitable for venues.
- Low-end or poorly tuned CRT projectors may suffer from color divergence or geometric distortion (for example, straight lines may not always appear completely straight, especially near the corners). However, CRT projectors offer more options for adjusting and counteracting geometrical inaccuracies. This is in contrast to other projector technologies, where moiré is an issue due to adjustments being software-based and applied directly to the DMD raster. Because CRT projectors use monochrome tubes, geometry adjustments do not have to line up with a raster on the tube faces, as the raster is generated by the electron beam itself. Software-based geometry adjustments in digital projectors do not only create an unsharp and scaled picture, it also forces the picture to be electronically buffered and processed, which adds input lag.
- CRT projectors use more power/cost more to run than LCD and DLP units. It is, however, comparable to plasma displays, which are also comparable in picture quality and performance.
- Unlike LCD or DLP projectors, CRT projectors are more prone to burn-in, if set to relatively a high contrast value and/or displaying static content for extended periods of time. This can lead to issues in brightness uniformity on projectors that frequently use both a full 4:3 and widescreen aspect ratio, as well as a change in colour temperature as the blue (and green) phosphors wear faster than the red. Overall burn-in is also a problem when moving or buying/selling CRT projectors, as different locations and different setups end up using different portions of the surface of the picture tubes.

Projector CRTs can be either air or liquid coupled. Air-coupled projector CRTs have a front flat face that also acts as a container with coolant, and there is an air gap between the face of the CRT and the flat back lens used for projecting the image formed by the CRT onto a screen. Liquid-coupled projector CRTs have a curved-inwards face with coolant and (on the side that faces the CRT's electron gun) a screen that is curved towards the inside with a dichroic coating, the coating increases light output while the curvature conforms it to the curved back lens of the projector, reducing image halos. There is also no air gap between the CRT and the lens. Glycol is hygroscopic (absorbs moisture) even through the silicon seals used in the CRTs to contain the glycol. This means that eventually the glycol can have too much water, breaking the glass of the container when it expands due to heat. This mainly affects air-coupled CRTs as in these the air bubble is on the same space as the container while liquid-coupled CRTs are not as affected since they have separate flexible silicone bellows which form the air bubble. The glycol may also react with the aluminum in the CRT cooling system and crystallize over many cooling and heating cycles creating CRT fungus, which degrades image quality since its optical properties are different than that of the surrounding glycol.

== See also ==
- LCD projector
- DLP
- Eidophor
- Talaria projector
- List of CRT video projectors
