= Video projector =

Device that projects video onto a surface

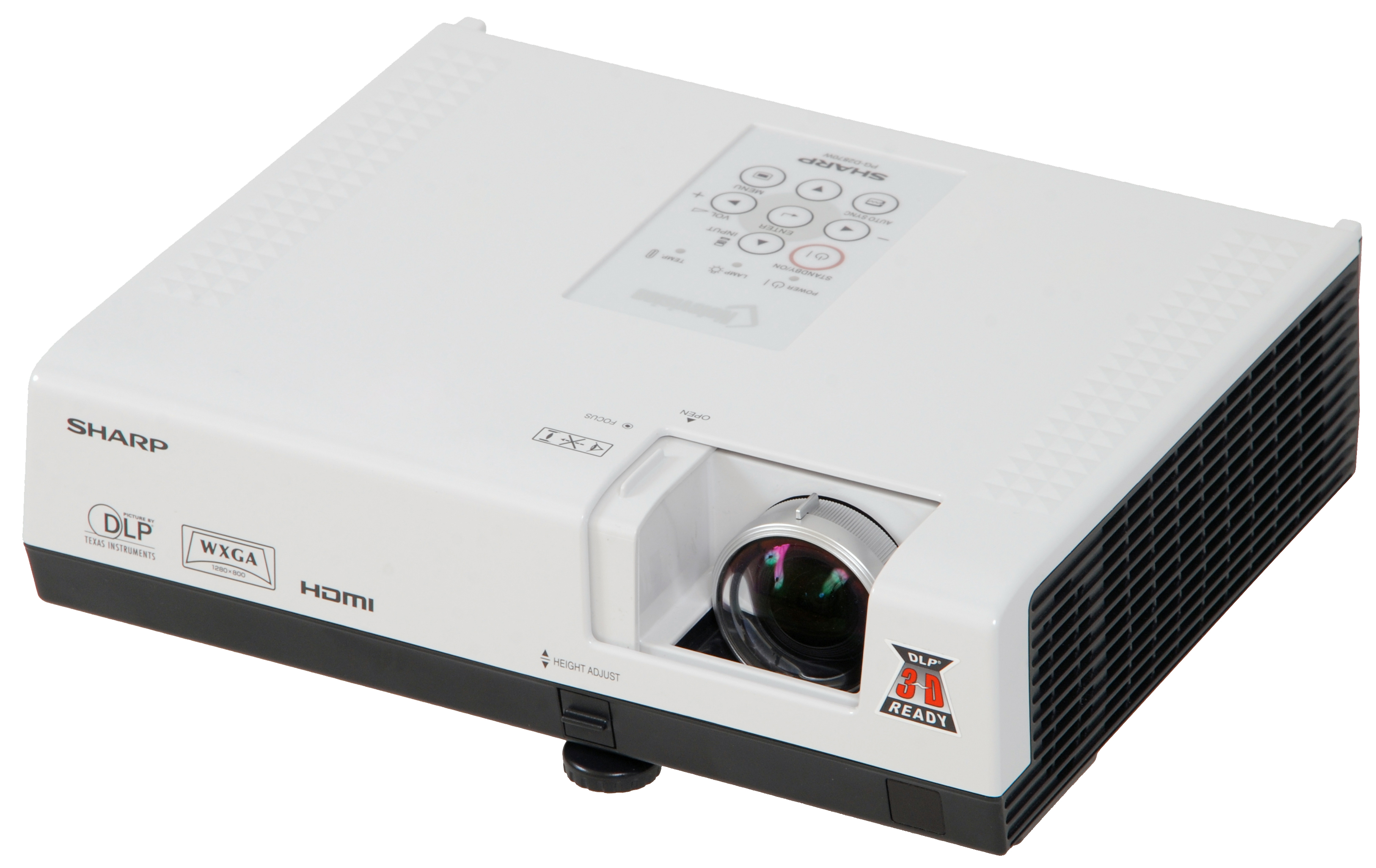
A projector in a standard form factor: The PG-D2870 projector from Sharp, which uses digital light processing technology

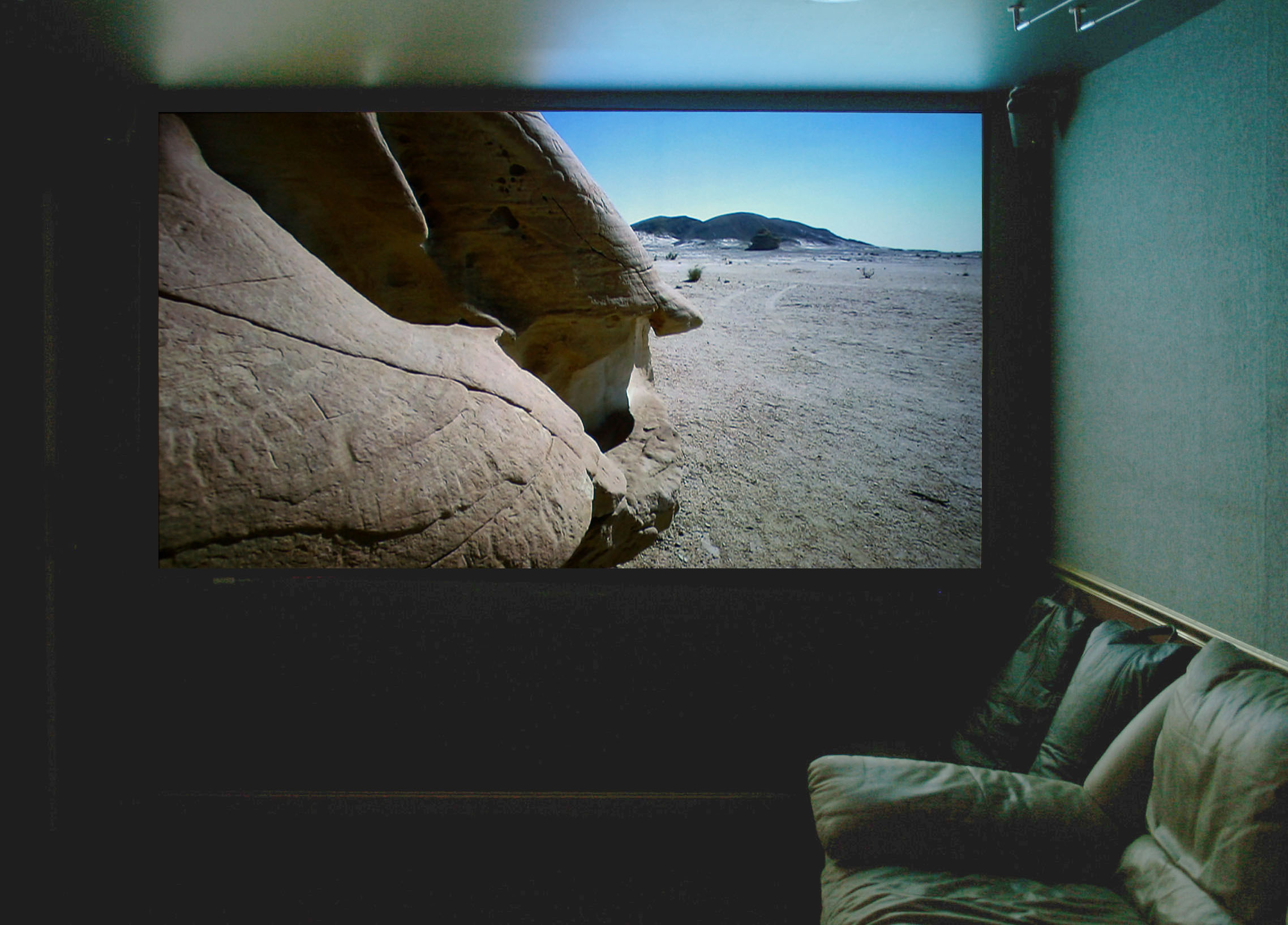
An image from a video projector in a home cinema

A video projector, also known as a data projector or digital projector, is an image projector that receives a video signal and projects the corresponding image onto a projection screen using a lens system. Video projectors use a very bright ultra-high-performance lamp (a special mercury arc lamp), Xenon arc lamp, metal halide lamp, LED or solid state blue, RB, RGB or fiber-optic lasers to provide the illumination required to project the image. Most modern projectors can correct any curves, blurriness and other inconsistencies through manual settings.

Video projectors are used for many applications such as conference room presentations, classroom training, home cinema, movie theaters, and concerts, having mostly replaced overhead, slide and conventional film projectors. In schools and other educational settings, they are sometimes connected to an interactive whiteboard. In the late 20th century, they became commonplace in home cinema. Although large LCD television screens became quite popular, video projectors are still common among many home theater enthusiasts. In some applications, video projectors have been replaced with large monitors or LED screens, or their replacement has been explored.

== Overview ==
A video projector may project onto a traditional reflective projection screen, or it may be built into a cabinet with a translucent rear-projection screen to form a single unified display device.

Common display resolutions include SVGA (800×600 pixels), XGA (1024×768 pixels), SXGA+ (1400×1050 pixels), 720p (1280×720 pixels), 1080p (1920×1080 pixels), 4K UHD (3840×2160), as well as 16:10 aspect ratio resolutions including WXGA+ (1280×800 pixels) and WUXGA (1920×1200 pixels).

If a blue laser is used, a phosphor wheel is used to turn blue light into white light, which is also the case with white LEDs. (White LEDs do not use lasers.) A wheel is used in order to prolong the lifespan of the phosphor, as it is degraded by the heat generated by the laser diode. Remote fiber-optic RGB laser racks can be placed far away from the projector, and several racks can be housed in a single, central room. Each projector can use up to two racks, and several monochrome lasers are mounted on each rack, the light of which is mixed and transmitted to the projector booth using optical fibers. Projectors using RB lasers use a blue laser with a phosphor wheel in conjunction with a conventional solid-state red laser.

The cost of a projector is typically driven by its base technology, features, resolution and light output. A projector with a higher light output (measured in lumens) is required for a larger screen or for a room with more ambient light. For example, a light output of approximately 1500 to 2500 ANSI lumens (lm) is suitable for small screens viewed in rooms with low ambient light; approximately 2500 to 4000 lm is suitable for medium-sized screens with some ambient light; over 4000 lm is needed for very large screens or use in rooms with no lighting control such as conference rooms. High brightness large-venue models are increasingly common in boardrooms, auditoriums and other high-profile spaces, and models up to 75,000 lm are used in large staging applications such as concerts, keynote addresses and displays projected on buildings. Video projectors can have a mechanism similar to local backlight dimming to achieve higher contrast ratios by using 6 DLP chips: 3 for display, and 3 for local dimming.

A few camcorders have a built-in projector suitable to make a small projection; a few more powerful "pico projectors" are pocket-sized, and many projectors are portable.

== Projection technologies ==
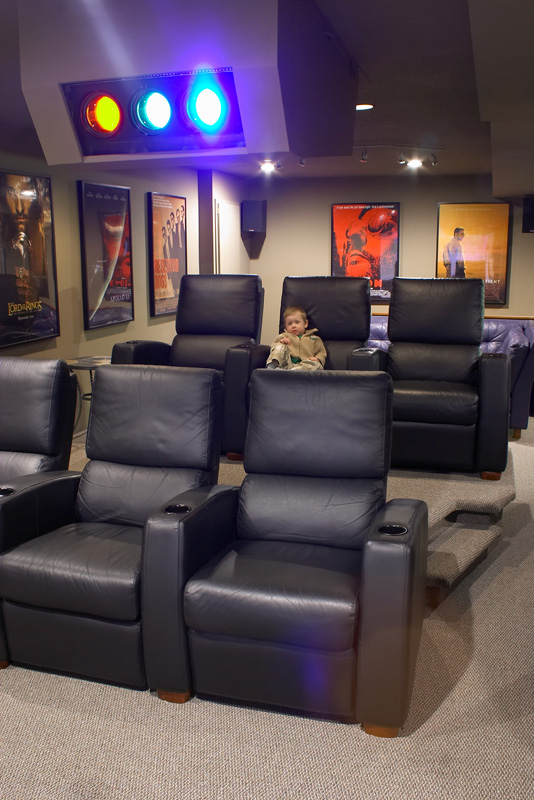
A Zenith Electronics 1200 CRT-projector-based home theater, ca. 2006

- LCD projectors using LCD light gates. This is the simplest system, making it one of the most common and affordable for home theaters and business use. Most LCD projectors use the 3LCD system, with one LCD panel for each primary color. Common drawbacks include a visible screen-door or pixelation effect, and the LCD panels deteriorating from heat and from UV degradation, leading to discolored spots or holes in the image, although recent advances have reduced the severity of these issues in some models.
- DLP projectors using Texas Instruments' digital light processing (DLP) technology. This uses one to three microfabricated light valves called digital micromirror devices (DMDs). The single- and double-DMD versions use rotating color wheels in time with the mirror refreshes to modulate color. The most common problem with the single- or two-DMD varieties is a visible rainbow, which some people perceive when moving their eyes. More recent projectors with higher speed (2× or 4×) and otherwise optimized color wheels have lessened this effect. 3-chip DLP projectors do not have this problem, as they display each primary color simultaneously, and offer higher light output and more accurate color reproduction, however the cost is significantly higher and thus 3-chip DLP technology is typically used in large venue, high brightness models, as well as digital cinema projectors.
- Liquid crystal on silicon (LCoS) projectors. Such projectors often process light in the wavelength domain, which enables correction of optical aberrations using Zernike polynomials. Some commercially available technologies include:
  - D-ILA – JVC's Direct-drive Image Light Amplifier based on LCoS.
  - SXRD – Sony's proprietary variant of LCoS.
- LED projectors, which use one of the above-mentioned technologies for image creation, with an array of light-emitting diodes (LEDs) as the light source, negating the need for lamp replacement.
- Hybrid LED and laser system developed by Casio. Uses a combination of LEDs and 445 nm laser diodes as the light source, while the image is processed with DLP.
- Laser diode projectors, developed by Microvision and Aaxa Technologies. Microvision projectors use Microvision's patented MEMS laser beam-steering technology, whereas Aaxa Technologies uses LCoS with laser diodes as the light source.
- Laser projectors, which either use monochrome blue lasers to excite a yellow phosphor medium, creating a broad spectrum of light, or three different lasers for each primary color (red, green, blue). These laser light sources are used in conjunction with common projection technologies, including 1- and 3-chip DLP, LCD and LCoS. Typical laser light sources used in projectors are rated for 20,000 hours before the light output is reduced to 50%, whereas lamps lose brightness quickly and need to be replaced after as little as 1000–2000 hours.

=== Obsolete technologies ===
- CRT projector using cathode-ray tubes. Once dominated the video projection market, but given their limited light output, size, weight and need for complex alignment, they have since been displaced by digital projectors and are no longer being made.
- Eidophor oil-film projectors.
- LIA (light image amplifier) light valves.
- ILA, marketed by Hughes-JVC. It is the predecessor to JVC's D-ILA offering.
- Schmidt-CRT, developed by Kloss Video.
- Talaria oil-film projectors.

Ultra Short Throw projectors are placed close to the wall where the projection screen is, and often use a lens and mirror system to achieve an ultra short throw ratio, where the projector is placed less than a meter away from the screen.

== Do-it-yourself video projectors ==
Some hobbyists build do-it-yourself (DIY) projectors at low costs. They build their projectors from kits, sourced components, or from scratch, using a television set, cellphone screen, or LED lighting as a light source. DIY construction plans can be obtained through the internet for domestic and classroom use.

== See also ==
- 3LCD
- Comparison of display technology
- Digital cinema
- Digital divide
- Handheld projector
- Holographic screen
- Inflatable movie screen
- Large-screen television technology
- Live event support
- Projection mapping
- Projection screen
- Screen door effect
- Video designer
