= Holographic screen =

Two-dimensional display technology that results in that of a free-space display

A holographic screen is a two-dimensional display technology that uses coated glass media for the projection surface of a video projector. "Holographic" refers not to a stereoscopic effect, but to the coating that bundles light using formed microlenses. The lens design and attributes match the holographic area. The lenses may appear similar to the Fresnel lenses used in overhead projectors. The resulting effect is that of a free-space display, because the image carrier appears very transparent. Additionally, the beam manipulation by the lenses can be used to make the image appear to be floating in front of or behind the glass, rather than directly on it. However, this display is only two-dimensional and not true three-dimensional. It is unclear if such a technology will be able to provide acceptable three-dimensional images in the future.

== Working principle ==
The display design can use either front or rear projection, in which one or more video projectors are directed at the glass plate. Each projector's beam widens as it approaches the surface and then is bundled again by the lenses' arrangement on the glass. This forms a virtual point of origin, so that the image source appears to be an imaginary object somewhere close to the glass. In rear projection (the common use case), the light passes through the glass; in front projection it is reflected.

== Interactive holographic screens ==
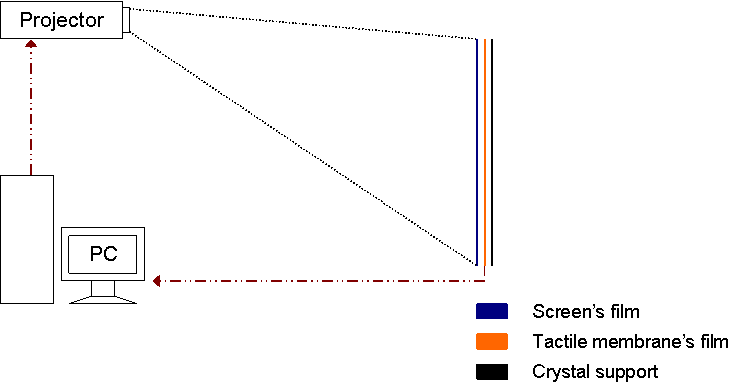
Basic scheme of interactive holographic screens

Interactive holographic screens add gesture support to holographic screens. These systems contain three basic components:

- A projector
- A computer
- Two films

The computer sends the image to the projector. The projector generates light beams which form the image on the screen. When the user touches the screen, a tactile membrane film reacts to these movements, generating electrical impulses that are sent back to the computer. The computer interprets the received impulses and modifies the projected image according to the information.

The projector generates the beams of light that will form the image on the screen's film, which is adhered to the crystal support. These crystal lenses can be a maximum of 16 millimeters (0.63 in) across. The projector is usually located behind the screen and must be placed a certain angle above or below the user's line of sight to avoid the dazzling the user. Therefore, it must be trapezoidal projector, so it can compensate for the deforming of the images at this angle of displacement.

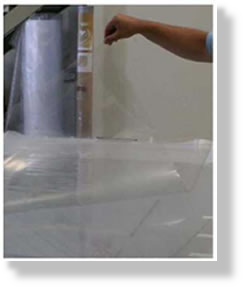
Thin film

The films are thin sheets of plastic applied to the crystal that allow both visualization and interactivity. There are two types of films:

- Screen film: This film can be opaque or transparent. It is possible to work with different degrees of opacity that can vary between 90% and 98%, depending on the application (interior, exterior, natural lighting, artificial lighting, etc.).
- Tactile membrane: This film enables interactivity. Capacitive projected technology catches user gestures and sends impulses to the computer.

== Uses ==
Most initial uses of this technology are advertising-related, such as shop windows. An interactive holographic screen can be mounted on the shop windows so that passersby can interact with it. Non-interactive holographic screens in shop windows can be coupled with artificial vision software to adapt ads based on the viewer's characteristics (age, sex, etc.).

These types of screens are often used for the display of Vocaloids at concerts because they simulate the illusion of a holographically-projected virtual performer.

== See also ==
- 3D display
- Free-space display
- Large-screen television technology
- Phantasmagoria
- Rear-projection television
- Video projector
