= 3LCD =

LCD projection color image generation technology

The 3LCD Logo

3LCD is the name and brand of a major LCD projection color image generation technology used in modern digital projectors. 3LCD technology was developed and refined by Japanese imaging company Epson in the 1980s and was first licensed for use in projectors in 1988. In January 1989, Epson launched its first 3LCD projector, the VPJ-700.

Although Epson still owns 3LCD technology, it is marketed by an affiliated organization simply named after the technology:"3LCD". The organization is a consortium of projector manufacturers that have licensed 3LCD technology to be used in their products. To date, about 40 different projector brands worldwide have adopted 3LCD technology.

According to electronics industry research company Pacific Media Associates, projectors using 3LCD technology comprised about 51% of the world's digital projector market in 2009.

3LCD technology gets its name from the three LCD panel chips used in its image generation engine.

== How 3LCD technology works ==
Creating Colors from White Light:
A projector using 3LCD technology works by first splitting the white light from the lamp into its three primary colors of red, green and blue by passing the lamp light through special dichroic filter / reflector assemblies called “trichroic mirrors.” Each trichroic mirror only allows specific colored wavelengths of light to pass through while reflecting the rest away. In this way, the white light is split into its three primary color beams and each is directed toward, and subsequently through its own LCD panel.

Image Generation at the LCDs:
The three LCD panels of the projector are the elements that receive the electronic signals to create the image which is to be projected. Each pixel on an LCD is covered by liquid crystals. By changing the electrical charge given to the liquid crystals, each pixel on an LCD can be darkened until it is totally opaque (for full black), lightened until it is totally transparent (allowing all the lamp light to pass through for full white) or shaded in varying degrees of translucence (for different shades of gray). This is similar to how a digital watch’s characters appear bold and black on its LCD when its battery is new, but start to fade gradually as its battery weakens. In this way, the brightness level on every pixel for each primary color can be very precisely controlled to produce the final pixel's specific color and brightness level required on the screen.

Color Image Recombination and Projection:
After each colored light is filtered through its individual LCD panel, the beams are recombined in a dichroic prism that forms the final image which is then reflected out through the lens.

== Competition ==
For mainstream projectors, the competitors to 3LCD technology are single-chip DLP technology (developed by Texas Instruments) and to a much lesser extent, LCOS projection technology.

== Advantages ==
Proponents of 3LCD projection technology claim that it has the following advantages over it closest competing technologies:

- 3LCD projectors can have higher color light output than single-chip DLP projectors. This is because 3LCD projectors mix and project the light beams from all three colors to form each individual pixel's color, while single-chip DLP projectors create colors by projecting them in sequence one at a time and rely on human color perception to mix and interpret the correct colors for each pixel.
- 3LCD projectors typically use less power compared to a single-chip DLP projectors of the same brightness rating.
- The way a single-chip DLP projector works sometimes causes viewers to see a "rainbow" or "color breakup" effect where false colors are briefly perceived when either the image or the observer's eye is in motion. As all three primary colors are displayed all the time by 3LCD projectors, they do not suffer from this effect.
- 3LCD projectors are able to display finer image gradations by giving each pixel on the projected image a smooth variation in brightness levels. This is because the liquid crystals for each pixel on an LCD panel can be given fine levels of opacity by varying the electrical charge. On the other hand, a single-chip DLP projector has a single mirror reflecting the lamp light to the lens on its DMD chip for each pixel. It varies the brightness of each pixel by vibrating the mirror between its on or off state in varying frequencies and relies on human perception to interpret the brightness of each pixel.
- 3LCD projectors are typically more affordable than those using LCOS or 3-chip DLP technologies.

== Disadvantages ==
- Older 3LCD projectors with large pixel pitches usually have a "screen door effect"
- Single-chip DLP projectors typically have higher contrast ratios compared to older 3LCD models of similar price or brightness rating.
- The smallest single-chip DLP projectors are smaller than the smallest 3LCD projector models.
- Current LCOS projector models typically deliver sharper images at higher resolutions than 3LCD projectors.
