= Sony =

Japanese multinational conglomerate

Sony Group Corporation
- Logo used since 1973

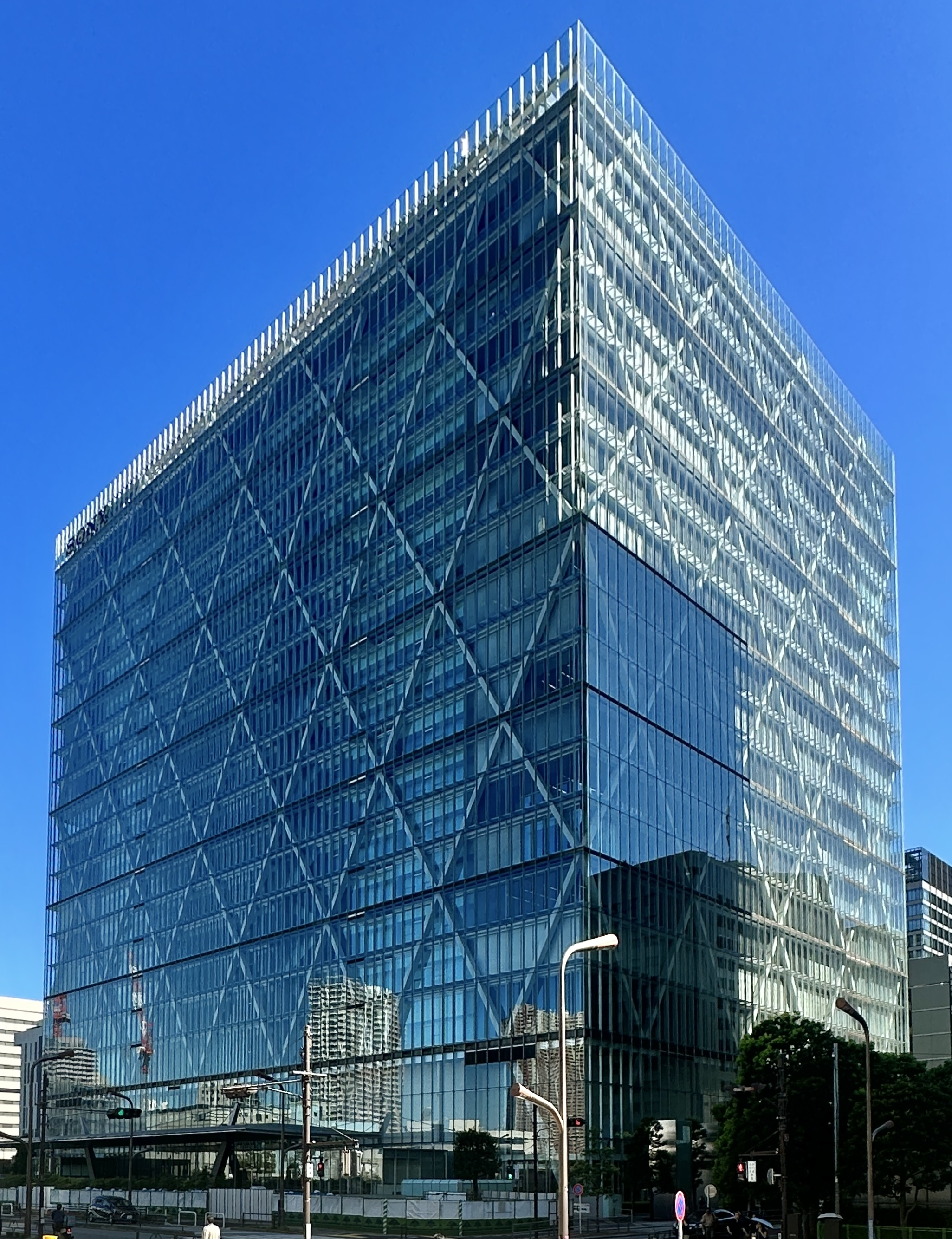
- Sony Group Corporation headquarters at Sony City, Minato, Tokyo
- Native name: ソニーグループ株式会社
- Romanized name: Sonī Gurūpu kabushiki-gaisha
- Formerly: Tokyo Tsushin Kogyo Co., Ltd. (1946‍–‍1957); Sony Corporation (1958‍–‍2021) (Note: Since April 2021, the "Sony Corporation" legal name is used for the Sony Group's electronics business that was previously known as "Sony Electronics Corporation".)
- Type: Public
- Traded as: TYO: 6758; NYSE: SONY (Note: NYSE: SNE between its American IPO in 1970 and 2021.); Nikkei 225 component; TOPIX Core30 component
- ISIN: JP3435000009
- Industry: Conglomerate
- Founded: 7 May 1946; 80 years ago Nihonbashi, Chūō, Tokyo, Japan
- Founders: Masaru Ibuka; Akio Morita
- Headquarters: Sony City, Kōnan, Minato, Tokyo, Japan
- Area served: Worldwide
- Key people: Kenichiro Yoshida (executive chairman); Hiroki Totoki (president and CEO); Lin Tao (chief financial officer)
- Products: Automotive; Anime; Cameras; Computer hardware; Consumer electronics; Films; Music; Robots; Semiconductors; Telecommunications equipment; Television shows; Video games
- Services: Advertising agency; Banking; Network services
- Revenue: ▲¥12.48 trillion (2025) (US$78.83 billion)
- Operating income: ▲¥1.44 trillion (2025) (US$9.1 billion)
- Net income: ▼¥1 trillion (2025) (US$6.32 billion) (Note: The net income figure presented reflects income from continuing operations rather than the consolidated net loss reported for the fiscal year. Sony reported a consolidated net loss attributable to its stockholders of ¥326.9 billion, primarily due to a one-time, non-cash accounting loss of ¥1.378 trillion arising from the partial spin-off of Sony Financial Group and the resulting reclassification of accumulated other comprehensive income into discontinued operations. Income from continuing operations, amounting to ¥1.031 trillion, is presented separately to reflect the financial performance of the businesses retained by Sony following the spin-off.)
- Total assets: ▼¥15.68 trillion (2025) (US$99.04 billion)
- Number of employees: 94,900 (2026)
- Subsidiaries: List of assets owned by Sony
- Website: sony.com
- Footnotes; Financials as of fiscal year ended 31 March 2026. References

Sony Group Corporation (Note: Japanese: ソニーグループ株式会社, Hepburn: Sonī Gurūpu kabushiki-gaisha) is a Japanese multinational conglomerate headquartered at the Sony City building in Minato, Tokyo. The Sony Group is a highly diversified global conglomerate with businesses spanning video games, music, film and television, consumer electronics, technology, semiconductors, financial services and others.

Sony was founded in 1946 as Tokyo Tsushin Kogyo K.K. (Note: Japanese: 東京通信工業株式会社, Hepburn: Tōkyō Tsūshin Kōgyō Kabushiki Kaisha; Tokyo Telecommunications Engineering Corporation) by Masaru Ibuka and Akio Morita. In 1958, the company adopted the name Sony Corporation. (Note: Japanese: ソニー株式会社, Hepburn: Sonī Kabushiki Kaisha) Originally an electronics company, Sony gained international recognition through products such as the TR-55 transistor radio and the CV-2000 home video tape recorder. The company subsequently became one of Japan's most prominent consumer-electronics manufacturers, with landmark products including the Trinitron color television and the Walkman and Discman portable audio players, while also played a major role in the development and commercialization of the CD, DVD and Blu-ray. Sony's flagship Bravia television lineup consistently earns industry 'King of TV' accolades for picture quality and color accuracy. Under its CineAlta brand, Sony is the largest manufacturer of professional video cameras for major feature film productions, while its Sony α series makes the company the second-largest camera manufacturer globally, behind Canon.

Expanding beyond electronics, Sony acquired CBS Records in 1988 and Columbia Pictures Entertainment in 1989, marking major steps into the music and film industries, which established the company as one of the "Big Three" major record labels and one of the "Big Four" major Hollywood film studios. In 1994, the company entered the home video game console market with the launch of the PlayStation, establishing a core business that has sold over 650 million game consoles worldwide. (Note: Worldwide lifetime hardware sales according to official Sony Interactive Entertainment disclosures and market estimates: PlayStation – 102 million units, PlayStation 2 – 160 million units, PlayStation Portable – 76 million units, PlayStation 3 – 87 million units, PlayStation Vita – 16 million units (estimated), PlayStation 4 – 117 million units, PlayStation 5 – 95 million units.) Since 2021, Sony has operated Crunchyroll, the world's largest anime streaming platform. Sony is a global leader in image sensors, which are used in smartphones, cameras, automobiles, and other electronic devices. Its semiconductor business has become an important component of the group's operations, particularly through Sony Semiconductor Solutions. Sony also expanded into financial services in Japan, establishing its financial services business in 2001.

In 2021, Sony adopted the name Sony Group Corporation as part of a transition to a holding-company structure, while its electronics business continued under the name Sony Corporation. Sony is publicly traded on the Tokyo Stock Exchange (a component of the Nikkei 225 and TOPIX Core30 indices) and also maintains American depositary receipts on the New York Stock Exchange, where it has been listed since 1961. For the 2025 fiscal year, Sony Group generated roughly ¥12.48 trillion JPY (approximately $83.4 billion USD) in total revenue. The largest share came from the Game & Network Services division, which brought in around ¥4.69 trillion JPY (approximately $31 billion USD) alone.

== History ==
=== Early years and founding ===
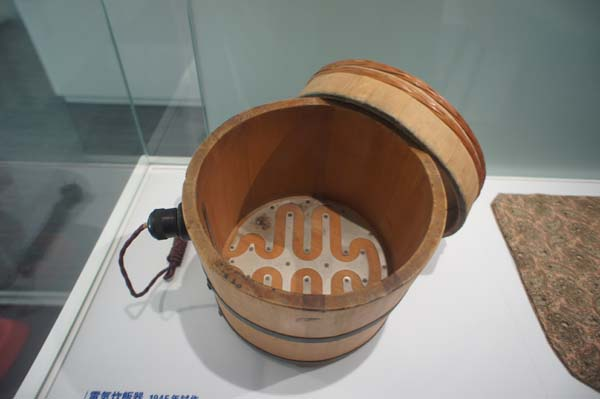
Sony's first product was an electric rice cooker in the late 1940s.

Sony's story began in the wake of World War II in 1946, when Masaru Ibuka, a former engineer who had served on the Japanese Imperial Navy's Wartime Research Committee, founded the Tokyo Tsushin Kenkyujo (Tokyo Telecommunications Research Institute), an electronics workshop in a department store building in the Nihonbashi area of Tokyo, where he repaired and modified small radios.Later, the fellow engineer Akio Morita, who had worked with Ibuka during the war but had lost contact with him, learned about his business through an article in the Asahi Shimbun. After reuniting, the two founded Tokyo Tsushin Kogyo K.K. (Tokyo Telecommunications Engineering Corporation). In its early years, TTK had capital of ¥190,000, with financial support from Morita's family. Not long afterward, the company launched the Type-G, Japan's first tape recorder.

=== The Sony brand and name change ===
Tokyo Tsushin Kogyo founders Morita and Ibuka realized that to achieve success and grow, their business had to expand to the global market, which required labeling their products with a short and easy brand name. While looking for a romanized name, they at first strongly considered using their initials, TTK. The primary reason they did not was that the railway company Tokyo Kyuko was known as TTK. The company occasionally used the syllabic acronym "Totsuko" in Japan, but during his visit to the United States, Morita discovered that Americans had trouble pronouncing that name. Another early name that was tried out for a while was "Tokyo Teletech" until Akio Morita discovered that there was an American company already using Teletech as a brand name.

The name "Sony" was chosen for the brand as a mix of two words: one was the Latin word "sonus", which is the root of sonic and sound, and the other was "sonny", a common slang term used in 1950s America to call a young boy. In 1950s Japan, "sonny boys" were a loan word in Japanese, which connoted smart and presentable young men, which Akio Morita and Masaru Ibuka considered themselves to be.

In 1955, TTK launched its first product under the "Sony" brand, the TR-55 transistor radio. Later, in 1958, TTK officially changed its corporate name to Sony K.K (Sony Corporation).

At the time of the change, it was unusual for a Japanese company to use Roman letters to spell its name instead of writing it in kanji. The move was not without opposition: TTK's principal bank at the time, Mitsui, had strong feelings about the name. They pushed for a name such as Sony Electronic Industries, or Sony Teletech. Akio Morita was firm, however, as he did not want the company name tied to any particular industry. Eventually, both Ibuka and the chairman of Mitsui Bank gave their approval.

=== Globalization and expansion ===
==== 1950s–2000s ====
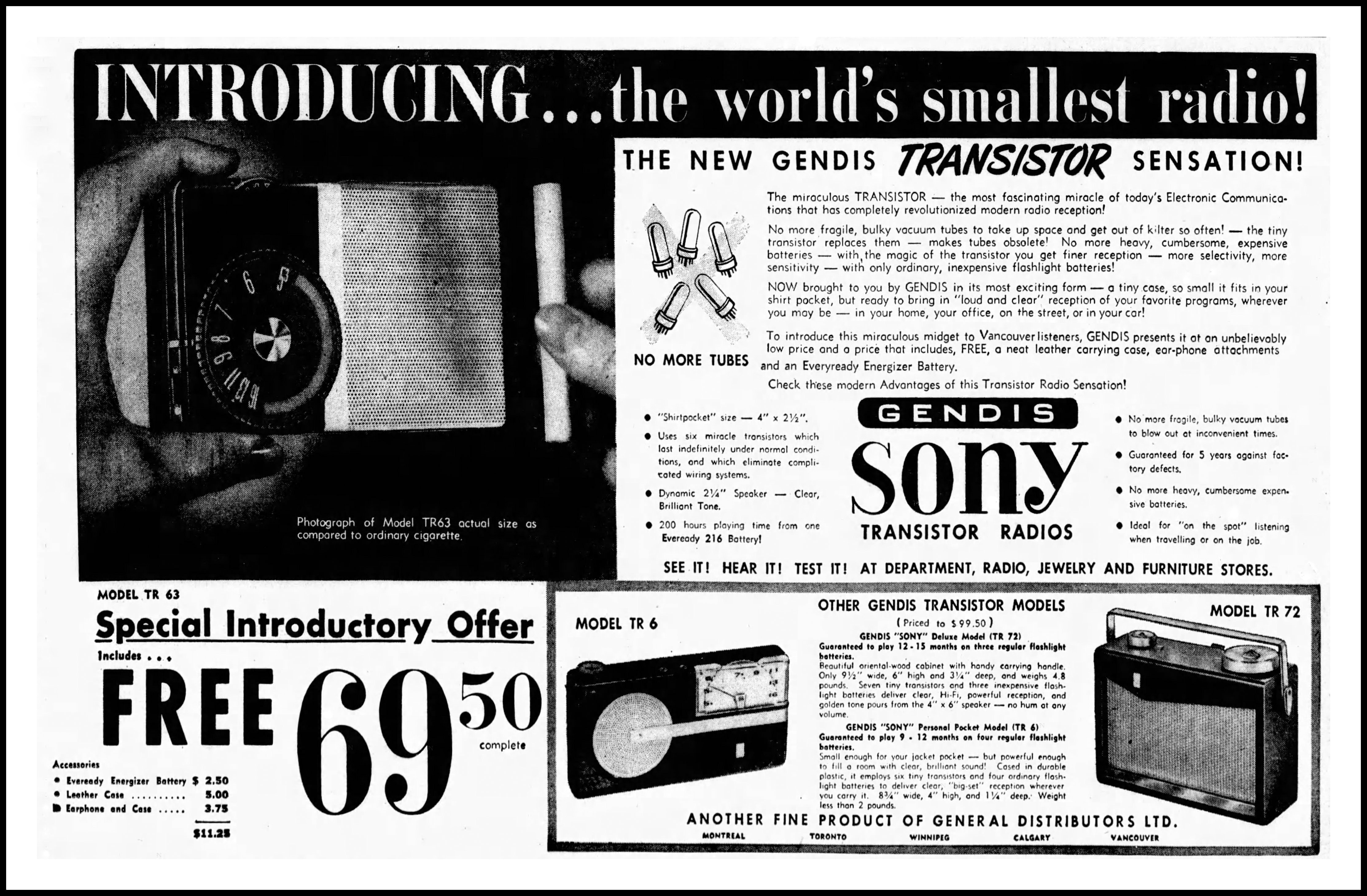
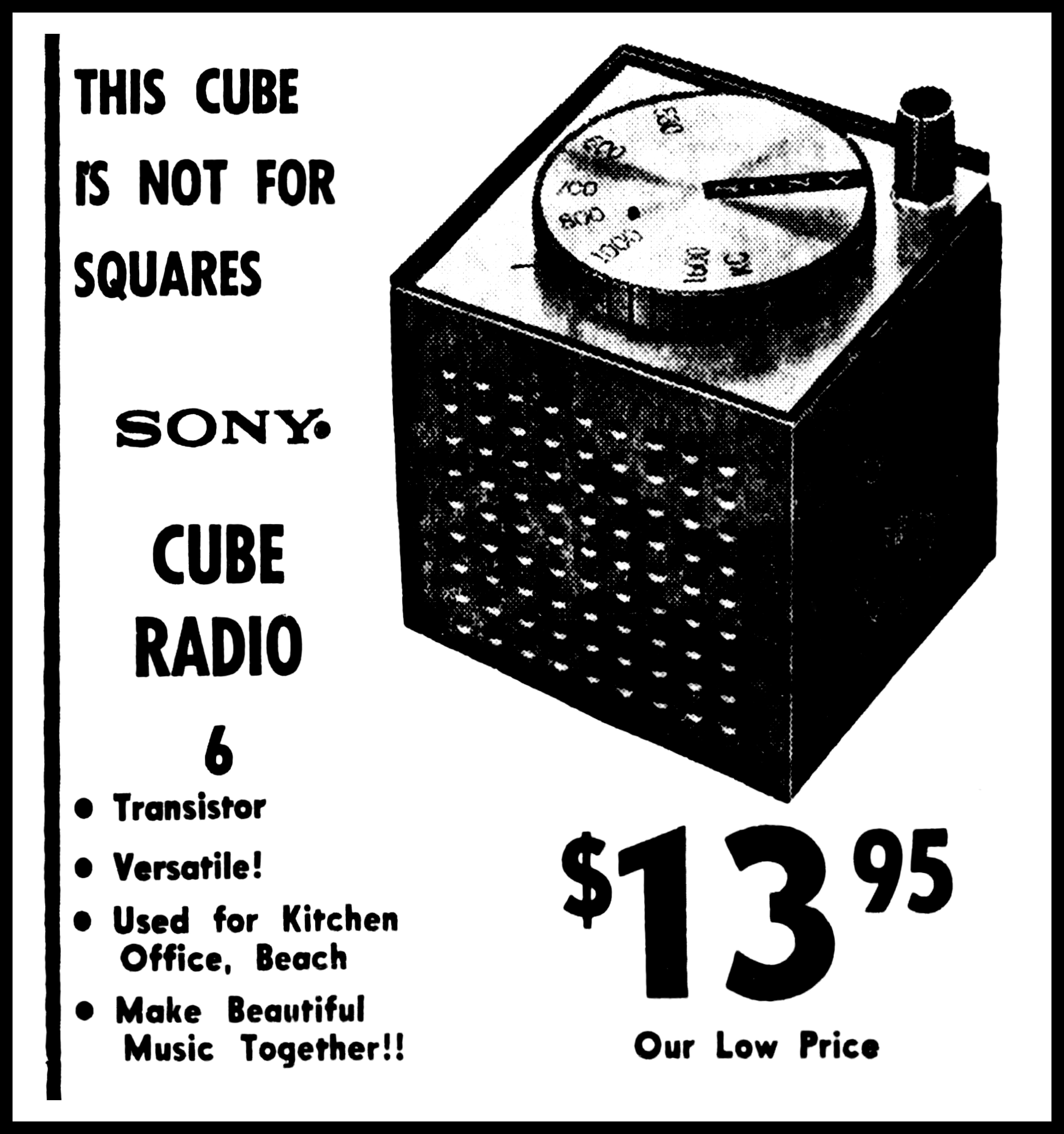
Advertising for transistor radio models TR-6, TR-63, TR-72 (1957), and TR-1819 "Cube Radio" (1966)

According to Schiffer, Sony's TR-63 radio "cracked open the U.S. market and launched the new industry of consumer microelectronics." By the mid-1950s, American teens had begun buying portable transistor radios in huge numbers, helping to propel the fledgling industry from an estimated 100,000 units in 1955 to 5 million units by the end of 1968.

Sony co-founder Akio Morita founded Sony Corporation of America in 1960. In the process, he was struck by the mobility of employees between American companies, which was unheard of in Japan at that time. When he returned to Japan, he encouraged experienced, middle-aged employees of other companies to consider joining Sony. The company filled many positions in this manner, and inspired other Japanese companies to do the same. Moreover, Sony played a major role in the development of Japan as a powerful exporter during the next decades, supplying the U.S. Military with bomb parts used in the Vietnam War. It also helped to significantly improve American perceptions of "made in Japan" products. Known for its production quality, Sony was able to charge above-market prices for its consumer electronics and resisted lowering prices. In 1968, Sony and CBS partnered to establish the CBS/Sony Records in Japan, marking its entry in the music industry.

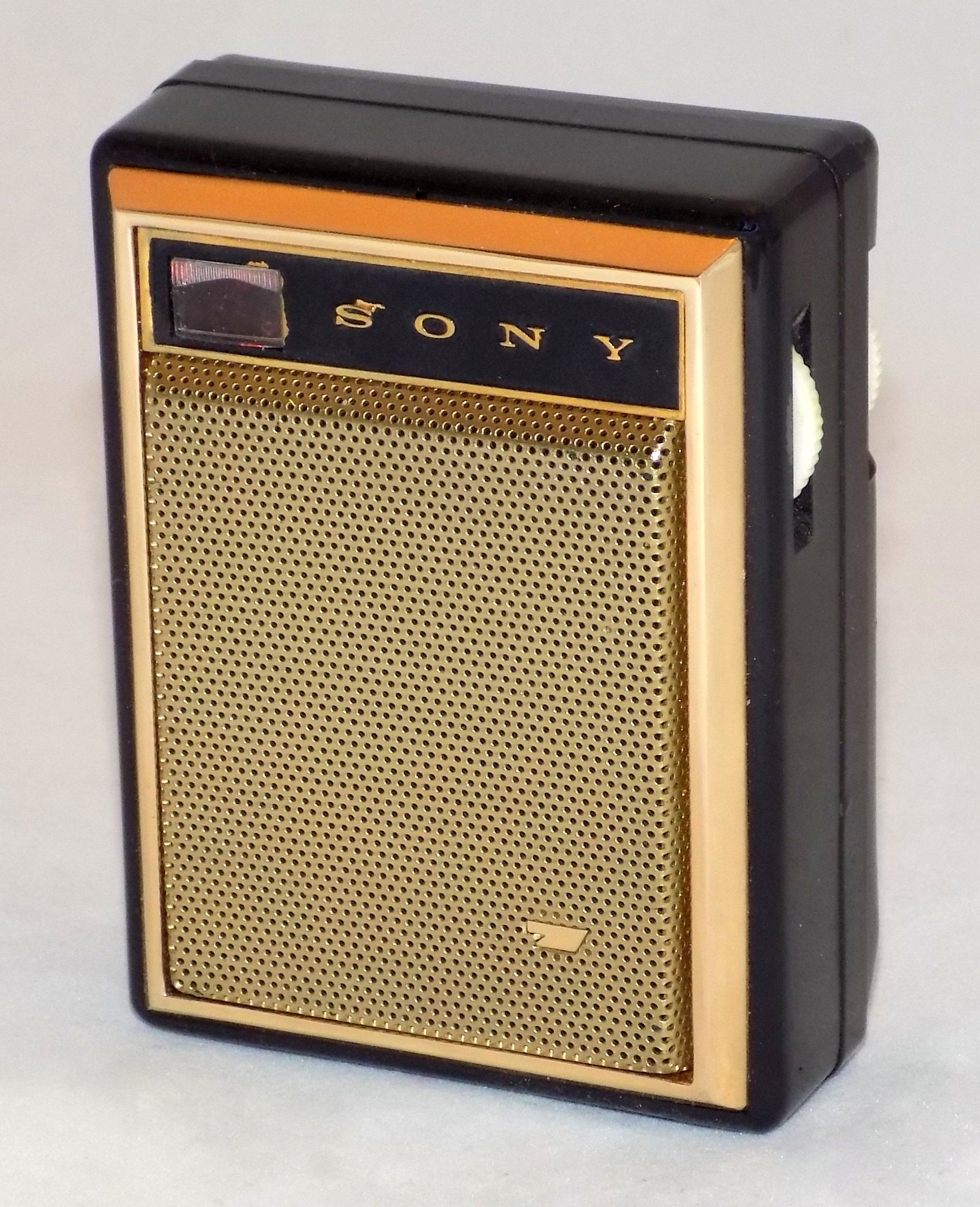
A Sony TR-730 transistor radio made in Japan, c. 1960

In 1971, Masaru Ibuka handed the presidency over to his co-founder Akio Morita. During his tenure, Sony partnered with Prudential to establish a life insurance and financial services company, Sony Prudential Life Insurance. Amid a global recession in the early 1980s, electronics sales dropped and the company was forced to cut prices, driving its profits down and raising questions about its ability to innovate.

After Morita, Norio Ohga became president in 1982. A former opera singer and Sony executive, Ohga played an important role in expanding the company beyond consumer electronics and into media and entertainment. He was closely involved in the development and adoption of the Compact Disc, which Sony developed jointly with Philips during the 1970s and early 1980s. In 1988, Sony acquired CBS Records, expanding its presence in the global music industry, and in 1989 it acquired Columbia Pictures, marking a major expansion into film and television. Ohga also supported the development of the PlayStation, which was released in 1994 and marked Sony's entry into the video game industry. Ohga succeeded Morita as chief executive officer in 1989 and remained chairman and CEO during much of Sony's expansion into entertainment.

In 1995, Nobuyuki Idei became president and began a series of reforms aimed at transforming Sony for the emerging digital and networked economy. His strategy emphasized the convergence of electronics, entertainment, games, Internet and communications services, and financial services. Sony sought to connect its hardware and content businesses through broadband networks and digital technology, while giving its individual business units greater autonomy. During Idei's tenure, Sony strengthened its position in mobile communications through the establishment of Sony Ericsson in 2001, expanded its semiconductor and digital imaging businesses, and developed network-based services and online entertainment. The company also continued expanding its game business, with the PlayStation 2 becoming one of the most successful video game consoles of its generation. However, the company's broad diversification and emphasis on convergence did not initially produce the expected results, as Sony struggled with declining profitability in several electronics businesses and increasing competition in digital consumer products.

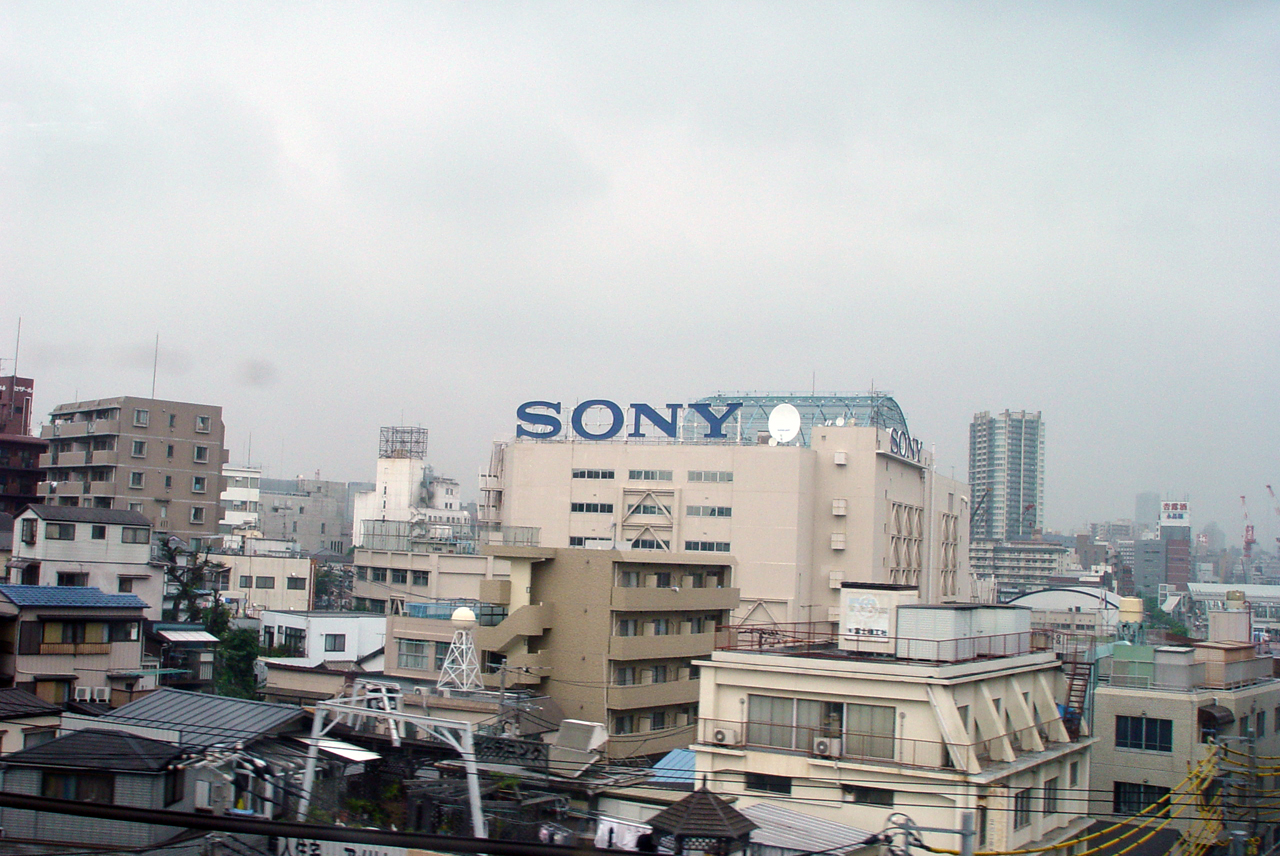
Before moving to Sony City in 2006, Sony was headquartered for nearly six decades in Tokyo's Gotenyama complex

Under the vision of co-founder Akio Morita and his successors, the company had aggressively expanded into new businesses. Part of its motivation for doing so was the pursuit of "convergence", linking film, music and digital electronics via the Internet. At the time, this expansion was unrewarding and unprofitable, threatening Sony's ability to charge a premium on its products as well as its brand name. In 2005, Howard Stringer replaced Nobuyuki Idei as chief executive officer, marking the first time that a foreigner had run a major Japanese electronics firm. Stringer helped to reinvigorate the company's struggling media businesses, encouraging blockbusters such as Spider-Man while cutting 9,000 jobs. He hoped to sell off peripheral business and focus the company again on electronics. Furthermore, he aimed to increase cooperation between business units, which he described as "silos" operating in isolation from one another. In a bid to provide a unified brand for its global operations, Sony introduced a slogan known as "make.believe" in 2009. Despite some successes, the company faced continued struggles in the mid-to-late 2000s.

==== 2010s ====
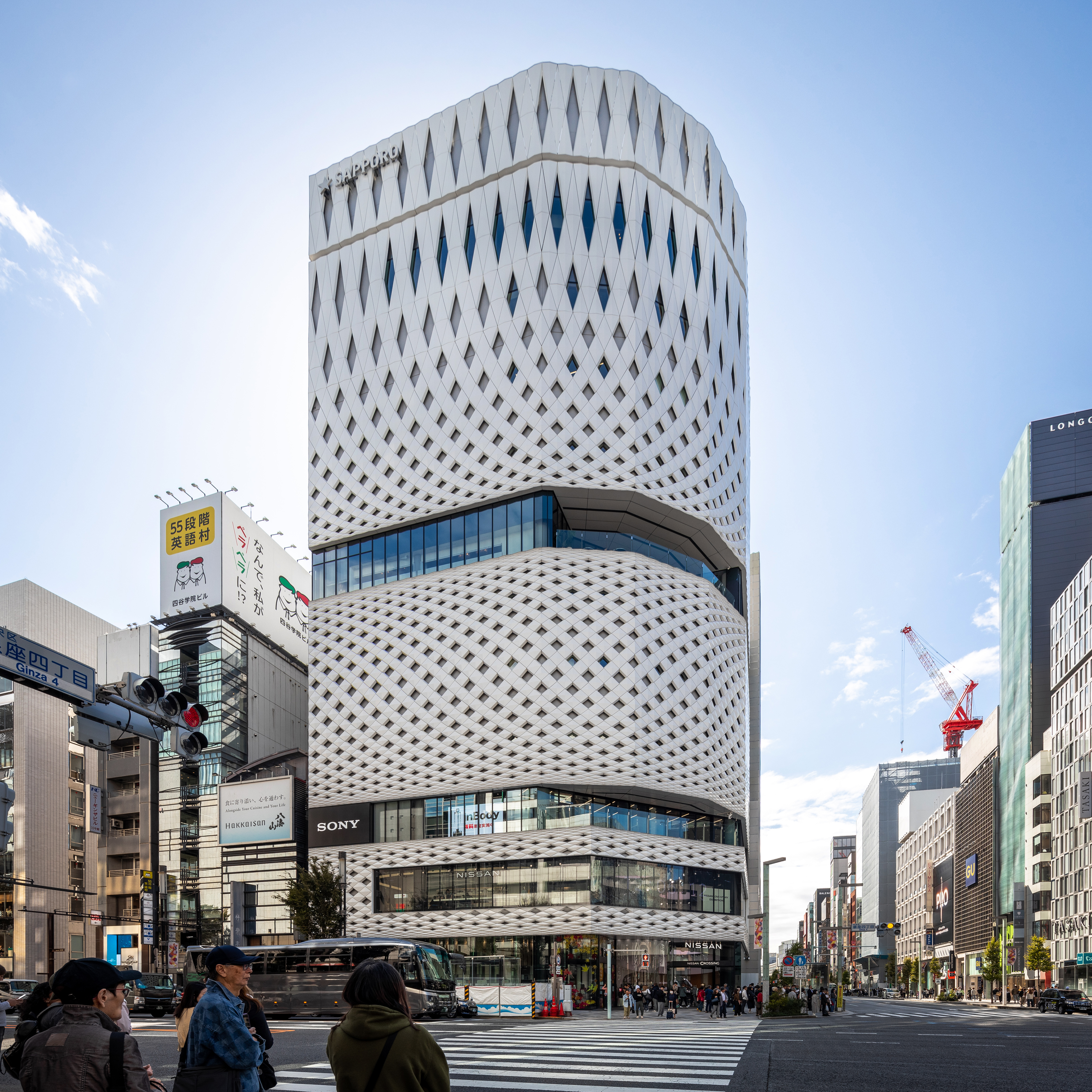
Ginza Place in Tokyo, housing Sony's flagship showroom and retail hub across three floors

In 2012, Kazuo Hirai was promoted to president and CEO, replacing Stringer. Shortly thereafter, Hirai outlined his company-wide initiative, named "One Sony" to revive Sony from years of financial losses and bureaucratic management structure, which proved difficult for former CEO Stringer to accomplish, partly due to differences in business culture and native languages between Stringer and some of Sony's Japanese divisions and subsidiaries. Hirai outlined three major areas of focus for Sony's electronics business, which include imaging technology, gaming and mobile technology, as well as a focus on reducing the major losses from the television business.

In February 2014, Sony announced the sale of its Vaio PC division to a new corporation owned by investment fund Japan Industrial Partners and spinning its TV division into its own corporation as to make it more nimble to turn the unit around from past losses totaling $7.8 billion over a decade. Later that month, it announced that it would be closing 20 stores. In April, the company announced that it would be selling 9.5 million shares in Square Enix (roughly 8.2 percent of the game company's total shares) in a deal worth approximately $48 million. In May 2014 the company announced it was forming two joint ventures with Shanghai Oriental Pearl Group to manufacture and market Sony's PlayStation game consoles and associated software in China. The same year, it closed 20 US retail locations.

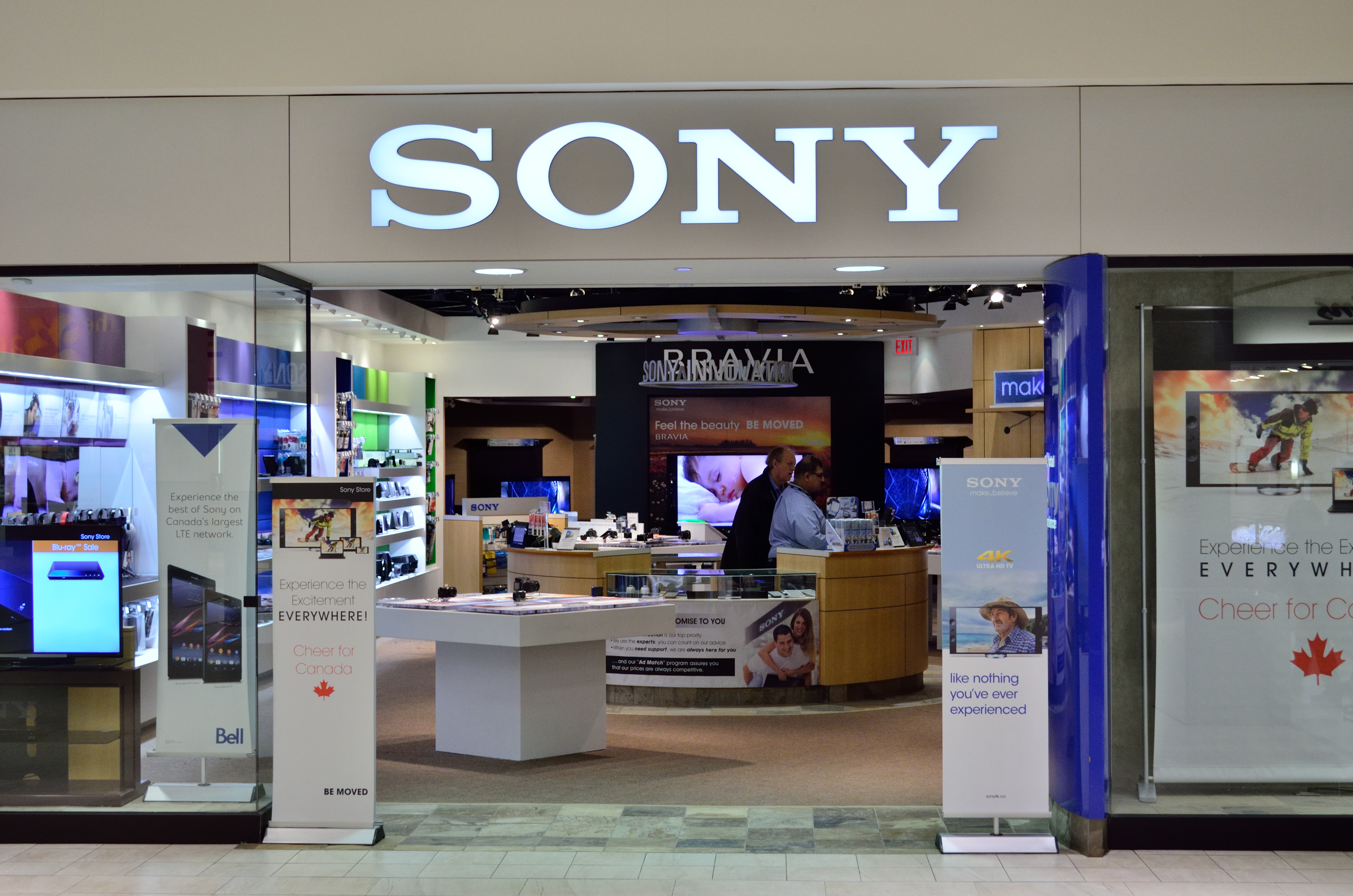
Sony Store (after rebranding from Sony Style) in Markville Shopping Centre, Canada

In late 2014, Sony Pictures became the target of a hack attack from a clandestine group called Guardians of Peace, weeks before releasing the anti-North Korean comedy film The Interview.

In 2015, Sony purchased Toshiba's image sensor business.

In 2017, Sony sold its lithium-ion battery business to Murata Manufacturing. That same year, the company closed its iconic Sony Building in Tokyo's Ginza district to begin a multi-phase site redevelopment.

In 2019, Sony merged its mobile, TV and camera businesses.

==== 2020s ====
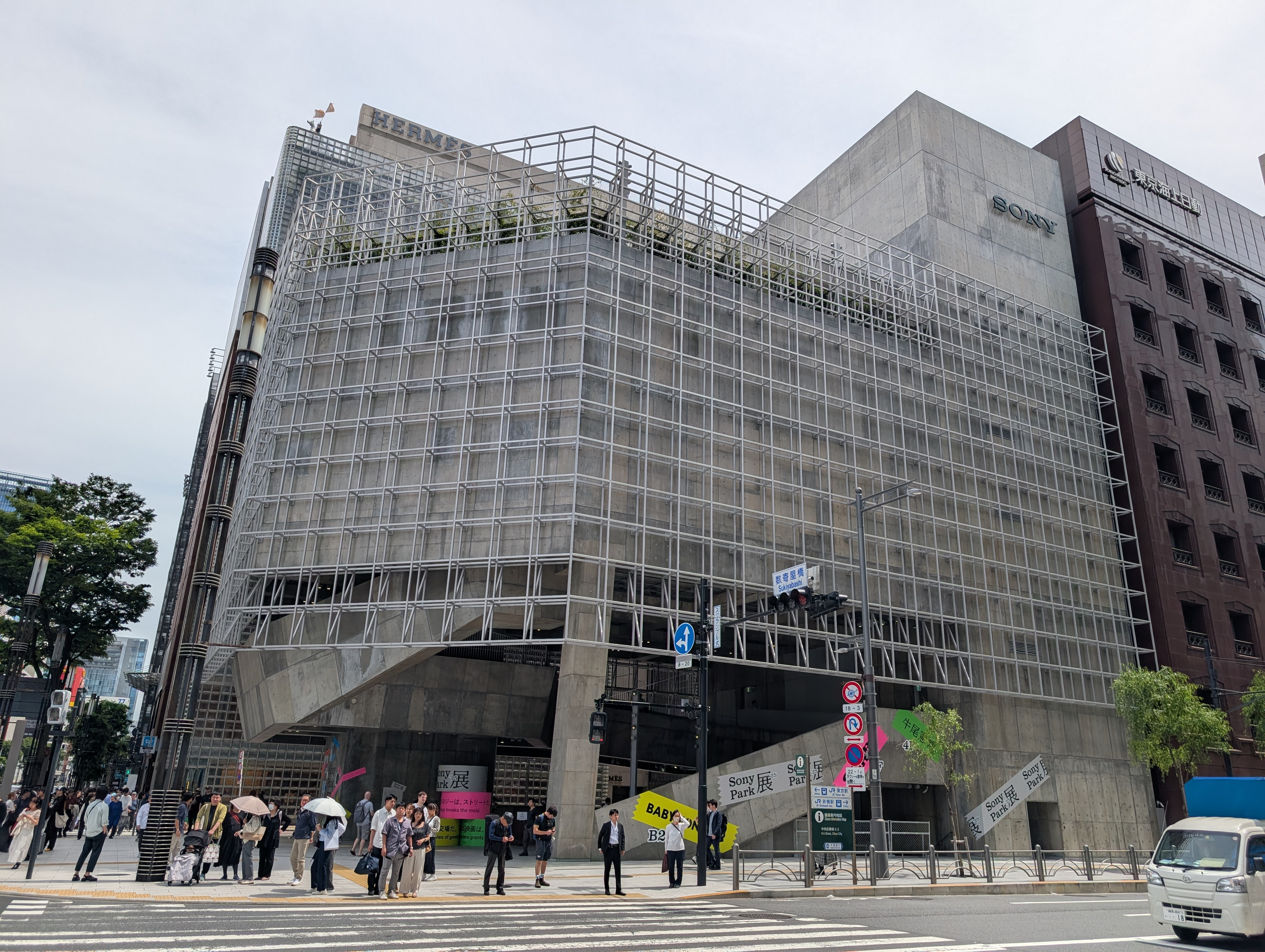
Ginza Sony Park, a multi-level public venue and event space created on the site of the former iconic Sony Building

On 1 April 2020, Sony Electronics Corporation was established as an intermediate holding company to own and oversee its electronics and IT solutions businesses.

On 19 May 2020, the company announced that it would change its name to Sony Group Corporation as of 1 April 2021. Subsequently, Sony Electronics Corporation would be renamed to Sony Corporation. On the same day the company announced that it would turn Sony Financial Holdings (currently Sony Financial Group), of which Sony already owns 65.06% of shares, to a wholly owned subsidiary through a takeover bid.

On 1 April 2021, Sony Corporation was renamed Sony Group Corporation. On the same day, Sony Mobile Communications Inc. absorbed Sony Electronics Corporation, Sony Imaging Products & Solutions Inc., and Sony Home Entertainment & Sound Products Inc. and changed its trade name to Sony Corporation.

In April 2021, PlayStation Studios closed its Japan Studio, absorbing its remaining development teams and resources into Team Asobi.

In 2024, Sony closed several of its PlayStation Studios developers, shutting down London Studio in May as part of broader company-wide layoffs, followed by the closures of mobile developer Neon Koi and Firewalk Studios in October.

In January 2025, Sony celebrated the grand opening of the newly constructed Ginza Sony Park in Tokyo's Ginza district, replacing the former historic Sony Building with an open urban park structure.

In February 2026, Sony announced the closure of PlayStation Studios subsidiary Bluepoint Games and in March shut down Dark Outlaw Games.

In March 2026, Sony and Chinese electronics manufacturer TCL Electronics signed agreements to form a strategic joint venture for the home entertainment business, covering consumer televisions, professional displays, and home audio systems. Under this agreement, Chinese firm TCL holds a 51% controlling stake to handle global development, manufacturing, and distribution, while Sony retains 49% and provides brand licensing and core technologies.

In July 2026, Sony sparked widespread public backlash and community protests after announcing plans to phase out physical media disc production for PlayStation consoles starting from January 2028, fueling intense debates over game preservation and digital ownership rights.

== Formats and technologies ==
Sony has historically been notable for creating its own in-house standards for new recording and storage technologies, instead of adopting those of other manufacturers and standards bodies, while its success in the early years owes to a smooth capitalization on the Digital Compact Cassette standard introduced by Philips, with which Sony went on to enjoy a decades-long technological relationship in various areas.

Sony (either alone or with partners) has introduced several of the most popular recording formats, including the 3.5-inch floppy disk, compact disc and Blu-ray disc.

=== Video recording ===
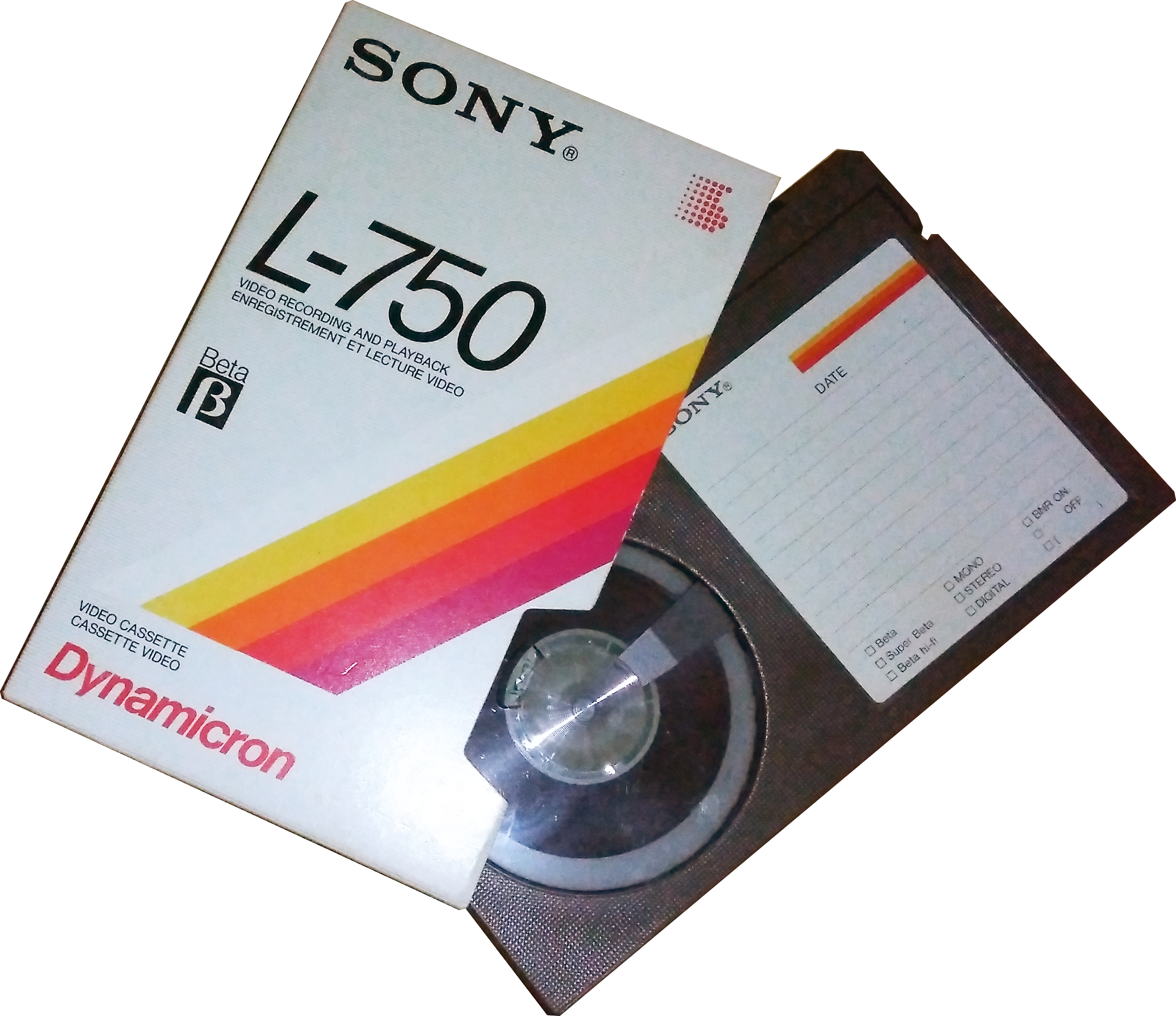
A Sony Betamax tape

Sony introduced U-matic, the world's first videocassette format, in 1971, but the standard was unpopular for domestic use due to the high price.

The company subsequently launched the Betamax format in 1975. Sony was involved in the videotape format war of the early 1980s, when it was marketing the Betamax system for video cassette recorders against the VHS format developed by JVC. In the end, VHS gained critical mass in the marketbase and became the worldwide standard for consumer VCRs.

Betamax is, for all practical purposes, an obsolete format. Sony's professional-oriented component video format called Betacam, which was derived from Betamax, was used until 2016 when Sony announced it was stopping production of all remaining 1/2-inch video tape recorders and players, including the Digital Betacam format.

In 1985, Sony launched its Handycam products and the Video8 format. Video8 and the follow-on hi-band Hi8 format became popular in the consumer camcorder market.

=== Visual display ===
Sony held a patent for its proprietary Trinitron until 1996.

Sony introduced the Triluminos Display, the company's proprietary color reproduction enhancing technology, in 2004, featured in the world's first LED-backlit LCD televisions. It was widely used in other Sony's products as well, including computer monitors, laptops, and smartphones. In 2013, Sony released a new line of televisions with an improved version of the technology, which incorporated quantum dots in the backlight system. It was the first commercial use of quantum dots.

In 2012, the company revealed a prototype of an ultrafine RGB LED display, which it calls the Crystal LED Display.

=== Audio recording ===
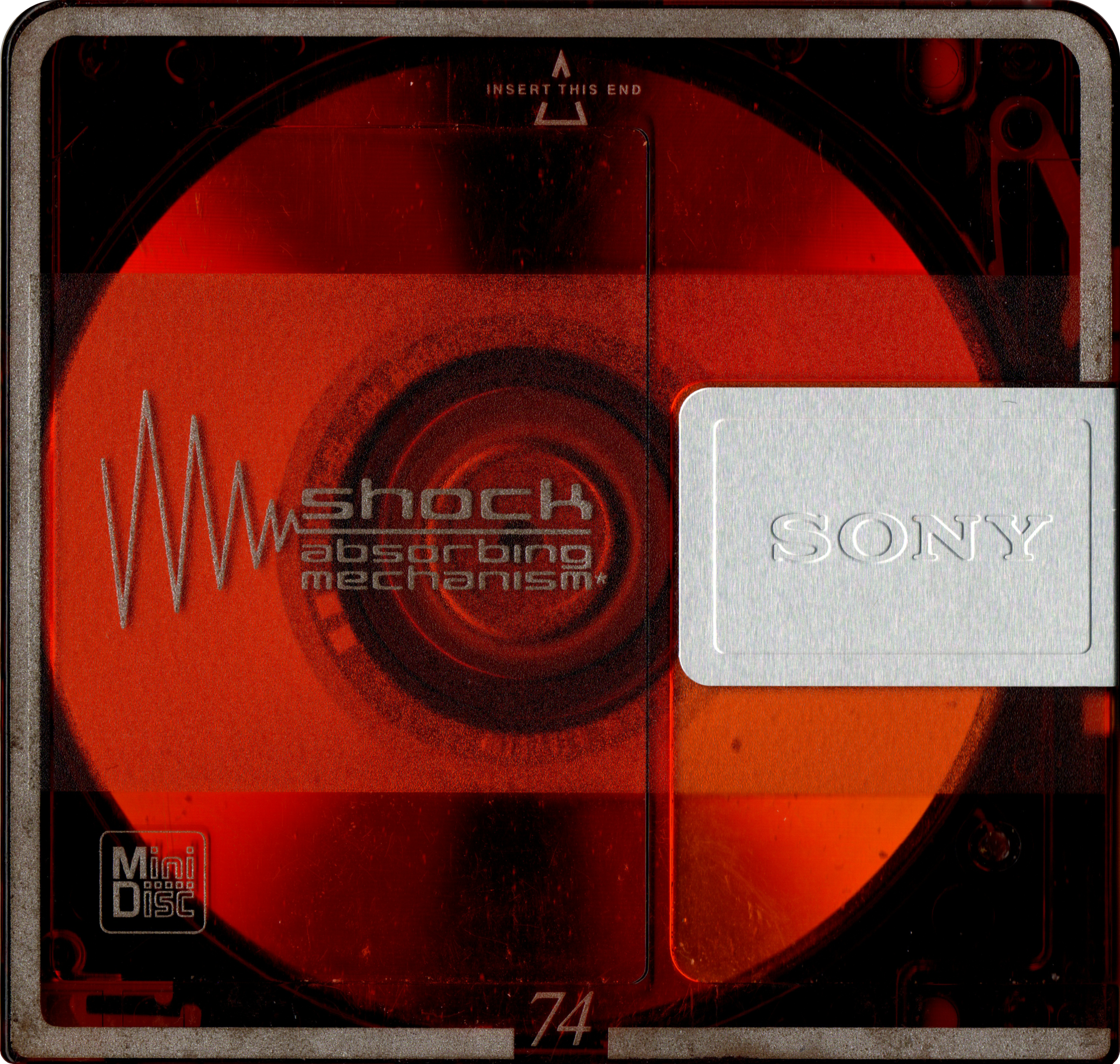
Front side of a Sony MiniDisc

In 1987 Sony launched the 4 mm DAT or Digital Audio Tape as a new digital audio tape standard.

Sony introduced the MiniDisc format in 1992 as an alternative to Philips DCC or Digital Compact Cassette and as a successor to the Compact Cassette. Since the introduction of MiniDisc, Sony has attempted to promote its own audio compression technologies under the ATRAC brand, against the more widely used MP3. Until late 2004, Sony's Network Walkman line of digital portable music players did not support the MP3 standard natively.

In 2004, Sony built upon the MiniDisc format by releasing Hi-MD. Hi-MD allows the playback and recording of audio on newly introduced 1 GB Hi-MD discs in addition to playback and recording on regular MiniDiscs. In addition to saving audio on the discs, Hi-MD allows the storage of computer files such as documents, videos and photos.

=== Audio encoding ===
SDDS logo

In 1993, Sony challenged the industry standard Dolby Digital 5.1 surround sound format with a newer and more advanced proprietary motion picture digital audio format called SDDS (Sony Dynamic Digital Sound). This format employed eight channels (7.1) of audio opposed to just six used in Dolby Digital 5.1 at the time. Ultimately, SDDS has been vastly overshadowed by the preferred DTS (Digital Theatre System) and Dolby Digital standards in the motion picture industry. SDDS was solely developed for use in the theatre circuit; Sony never intended to develop a home theatre version of SDDS.

Sony and Philips jointly developed the Sony-Philips digital interface format (S/PDIF) and the high-fidelity audio system SACD. The latter became entrenched in a format war with DVD-Audio. Still, neither gained a major foothold with the general public. CDs had been preferred by consumers because of the ubiquitous presence of CD drives in consumer devices until the early 2000s when the iPod and streaming services became available.

In 2015, Sony introduced LDAC, a proprietary audio coding technology which allows streaming high-resolution audio over Bluetooth connections at up to 990 kbit/s at 32 bit/96 kHz. Sony also contributed it as part of the Android Open Source Project starting from Android 8.0 "Oreo", enabling every OEM to integrate this standard into their own Android devices freely. However the decoder library is proprietary, so receiving devices require licenses. On 17 September 2019, the Japan Audio Society (JAS) certified LDAC with its Hi-Res Audio Wireless certification. Currently the only codecs with the Hi-Res Audio Wireless certification are LDAC and LHDC, another competing standard.

=== Optical storage ===
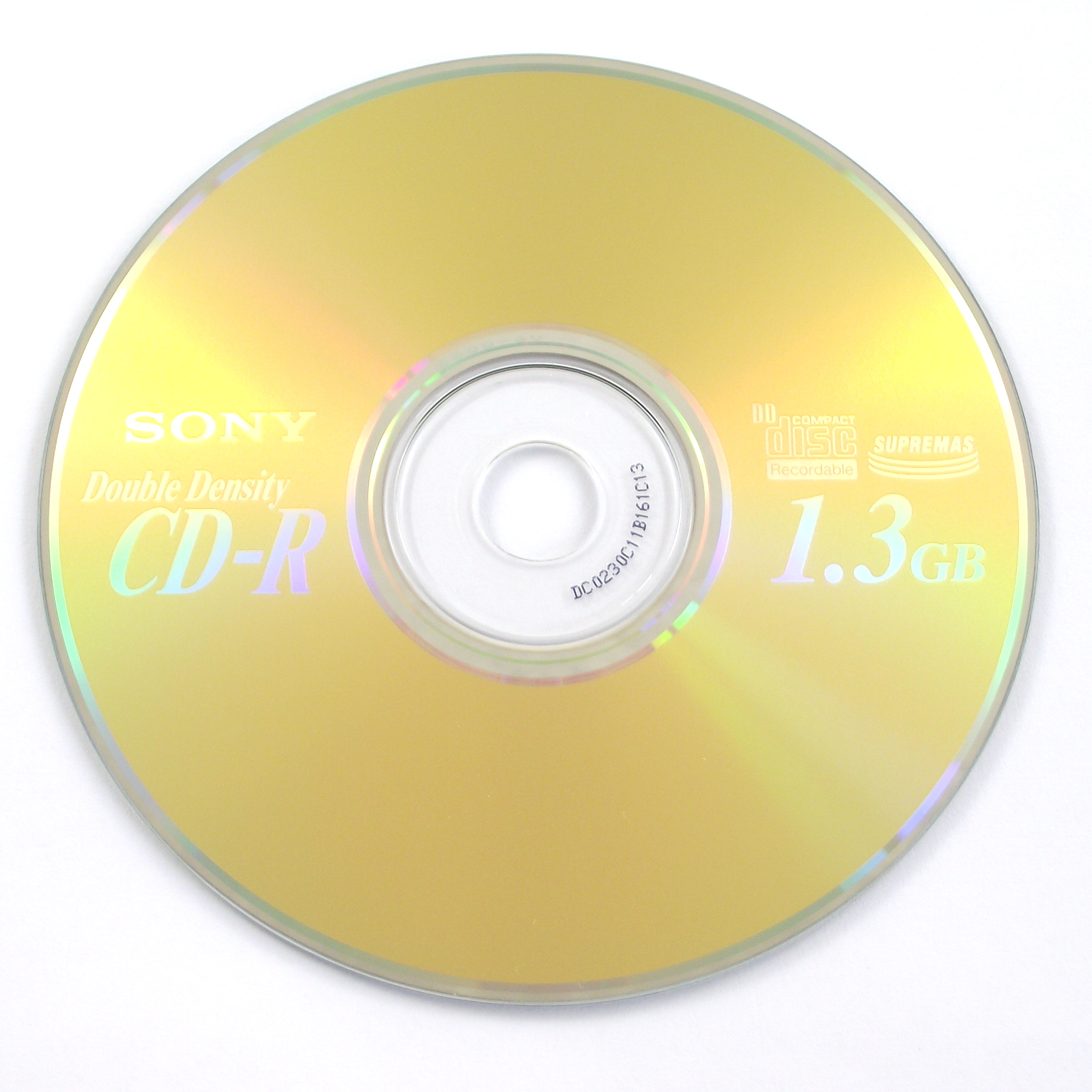
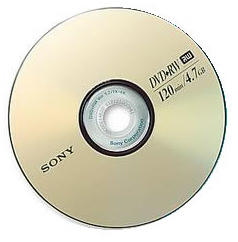
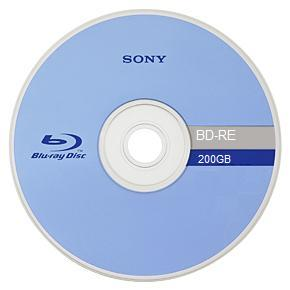
Sony played a central role in developing key optical media standards, including the CD (1983), DVD (1997) and Blu-ray (2006).

Sony demonstrated an optical digital audio disc in 1977 and soon joined hands with Philips, another major contender for the storage technology, to establish a worldwide standard. In 1983, the two companies jointly announced the Compact Disc (CD). In 1984, Sony launched the Discman series, an expansion of the Walkman brand to portable CD players. Sony began to improve performance and capacity of the novel format. It launched write-once optical discs (WO) and magneto-optical discs which were around 125MB size for the specific use of archival data storage, in 1986 and 1988 respectively.

In the early 1990s, two high-density optical storage standards were being developed: one was the MultiMedia Compact Disc (MMCD), backed by Philips and Sony, and the other was the Super Density Disc (SD), supported by Toshiba and many others. Philips and Sony abandoned its MMCD format and agreed upon Toshiba's SD format with only one modification. The unified disc format was called DVD and was introduced in 1997.

Sony was one of the leading developers of the Blu-ray optical disc format, the newest standard for disc-based content delivery. The first Blu-ray players became commercially available in 2006. The format emerged as the standard for HD media over the competing format, Toshiba's HD DVD, after a two-year-long high-definition optical disc format war.

Sony's laser communication devices for small satellites rely on the technologies developed for the company's optical disc products.

=== Disk storage ===
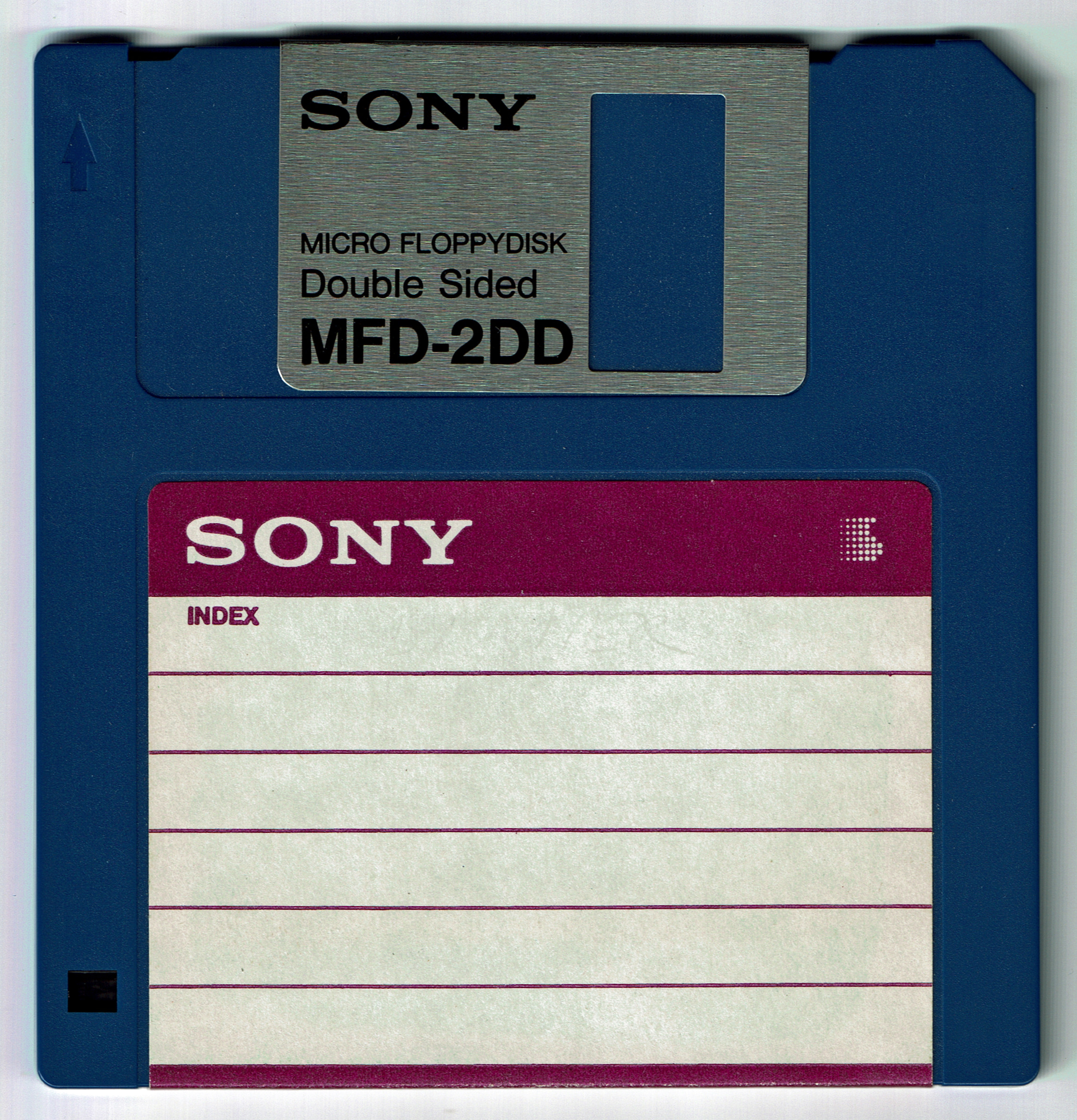
Front side of a Sony 3.5-inch (89 mm) floppy disk

In 1983, Sony introduced 90 mm micro diskettes, better known as 3.5-inch (89 mm) floppy disks, which it had developed at a time when there were 4" floppy disks, and many variations from different companies, to replace the then on-going 5.25" floppy disks. Sony had great success and the format became dominant. 3.5" floppy disks gradually became obsolete as they were replaced by current media formats. Sony held more than a 70 percent share of the market when it decided to pull the plug on the format in 2010.

Sony still develops magnetic tape storage technologies along with IBM, and are one of only two manufacturers of Linear Tape-Open (LTO) cartridges.

=== Flash memory ===
In 1998, Sony launched the Memory Stick format, the flash memory cards for use in Sony lines of digital cameras and portable music players. It has seen little support outside of Sony's own products, with Secure Digital cards (SD) commanding considerably greater popularity. Sony has made updates to the Memory Stick format with Memory Stick Duo and Memory Stick Micro. The company has also released USB flash drive products, branded under the Micro Vault line.

=== Communication ===
Sony introduced FeliCa, a contactless IC card technology primarily used in contactless payment, as a result of the company's joint development and commercialization of Near-Field Communication (NFC) with Philips. The standard is largely offered in two forms, either chips embedded in smartphones or plastic cards with chips embedded in them. Sony plans to implement this technology in train systems across Asia.

In 2019, Sony launched the ELTRES, the company's proprietary low-power wide-area wireless communication (LPWAN) standard.

=== Continued research and development ===
In 2021, the WIPO's annual review of the World Intellectual Property Indicators report ranked Sony's as ninth in the world for the number of patent applications published under the PCT System. 1,793 patent applications were published by Sony during 2020. This position is up from its previous ranking as 13th in 2019 with 1,566 applications.

== Business units ==
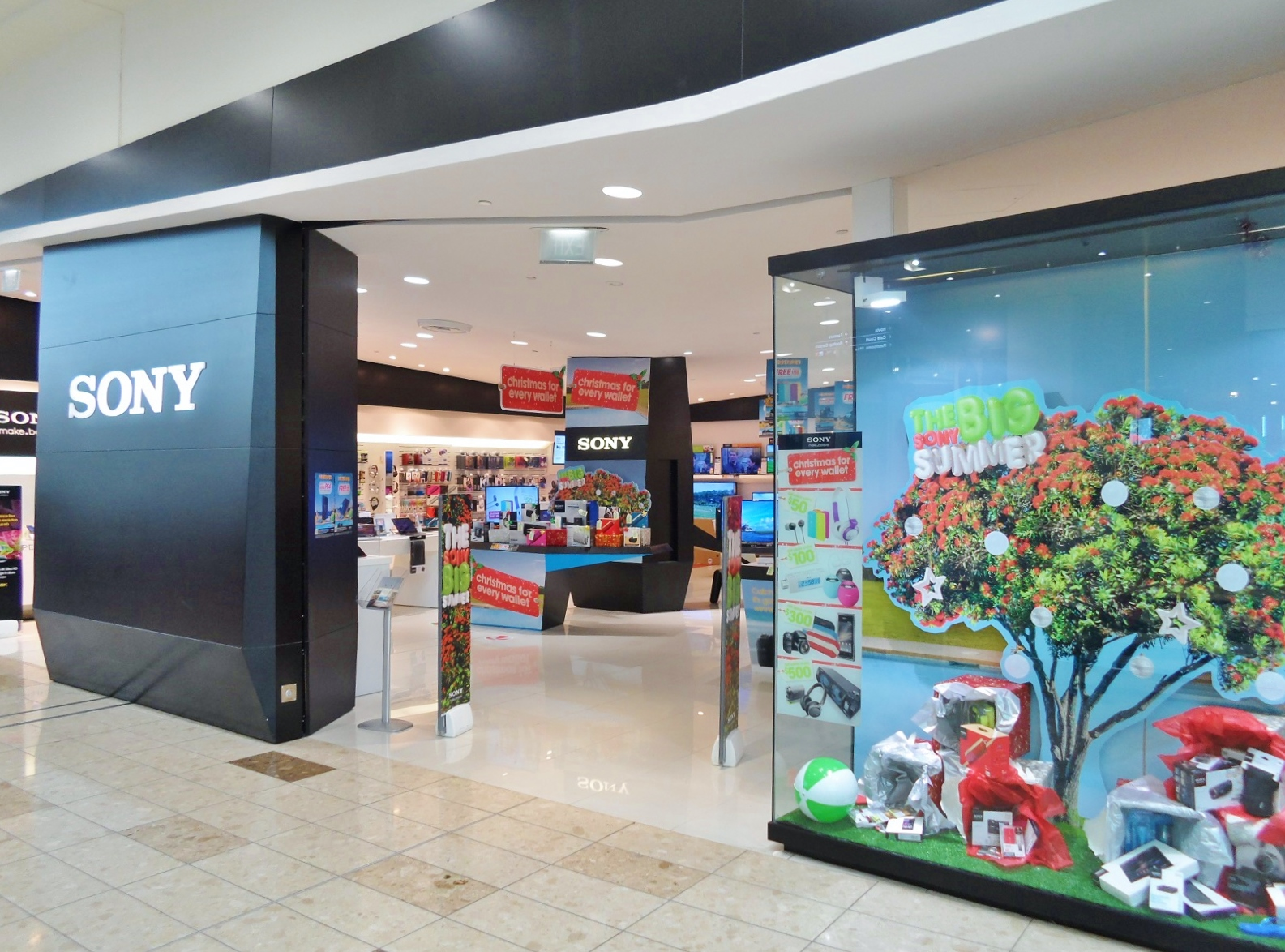
Sony at Westfield Riccarton shopping centre in Christchurch, New Zealand

Financial analysts described Sony as a "corporate octopus" owing to its vast and highly diversified business portfolio. Beyond its core electronics and media operations, the company maintained a wide range of secondary business activities across multiple industries. Through a series of restructuring initiatives beginning in the late 2000s, the company systematically divested non-core operations, including Sony Chemicals and the VAIO personal computer division, to sharpen its strategic focus on entertainment, image sensors and hardware technology.

Sony Interactive Entertainment booth at Tokyo Game Show

Sony booth at Taipei Photography & Video Device Exhibition

In April 2021, Sony Corporation was rebranded Sony Group Corporation. Sony organizes its principal global operations into five primary business segments. The parent company in Japan directly oversees these segments, even though several divisions maintain their primary corporate hubs in the United States.

- The Entertainment, Technology & Services segment manages Sony's hardware operations, including consumer audio equipment, Bravia televisions, Alpha digital cameras, broadcast hardware, professional production tools, Xperia mobile devices and network services.
- The Imaging & Sensing Solutions segment operates under Sony Semiconductor Solutions, handling the research, development and fabrication of advanced CMOS image sensors, micro-displays and integrated circuits for global smartphone manufacturers and industrial applications.
- The Game & Network Services segment is managed under Sony Interactive Entertainment, overseeing PlayStation console hardware, software development, network infrastructure and first-party game development studios.
- The Pictures segment operates under Sony Pictures Entertainment, encompassing motion picture production and distribution through Columbia Pictures and TriStar Pictures, television series production, television channels and streaming services, including Crunchyroll.
- The Music segment is managed globally by Sony Music Group and in Japan by Sony Music Entertainment Japan, covering recorded music labels like Columbia Records and Epic Records, music publishing assets and specialized visual entertainment production.

The Financial Services segment historically operated as a wholly owned subsidiary under Sony Financial Group Inc., managing insurance and direct online banking through Sony Bank exclusively within Japan. Following a partial spin-off executed in late 2025, Sony Financial Group operates as an independently listed company, with Sony Corporation maintaining a minority equity stake.

For the 2025 fiscal year, Sony Group generated roughly ¥12.48 trillion JPY (approximately $83.4 billion USD) in total revenue. The largest share came from the Game & Network Services division, which brought in around ¥4.69 trillion JPY (approximately $31 billion USD) alone.

== Electronics ==
=== Audio ===
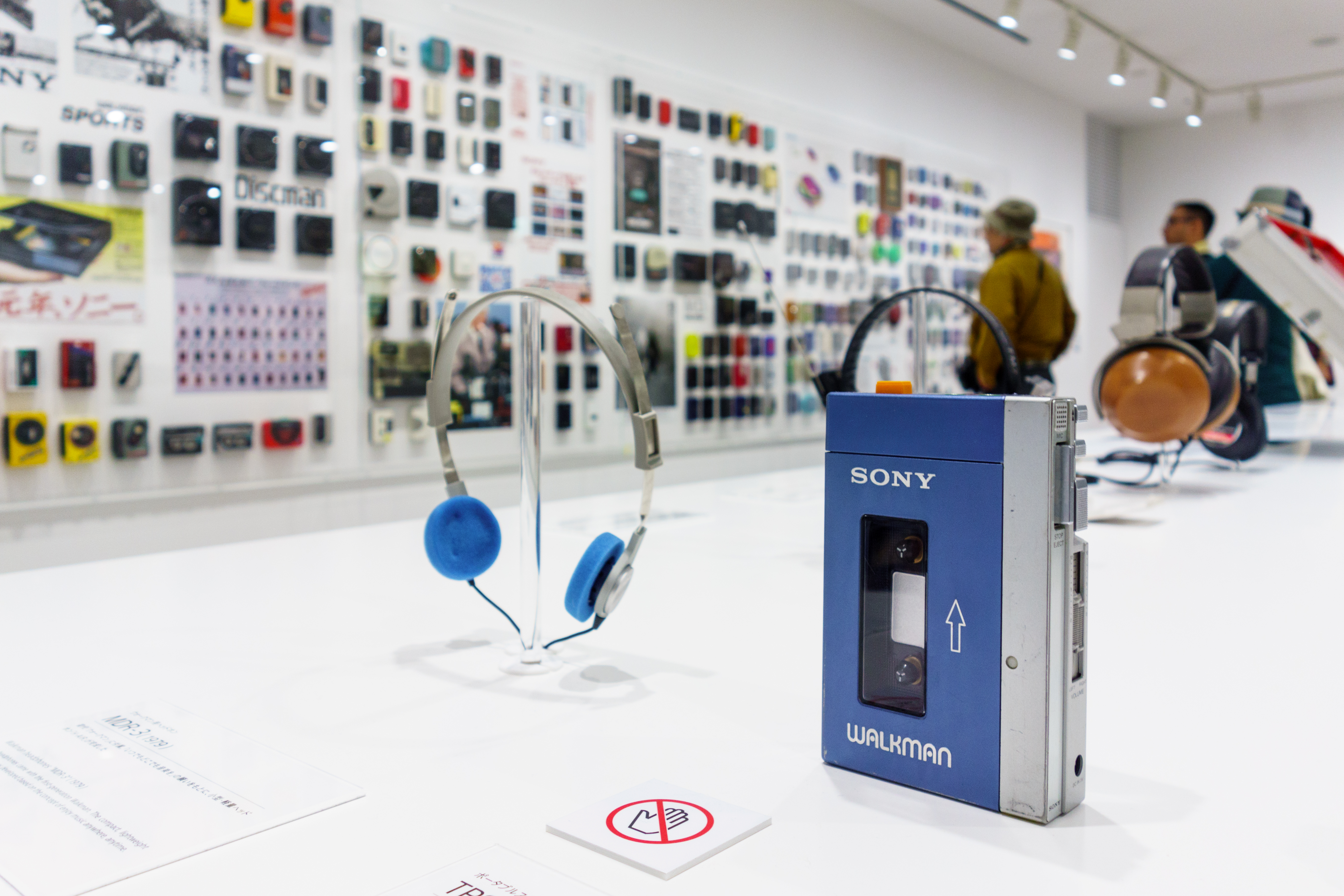
First Walkman TPS-L2 from 1979

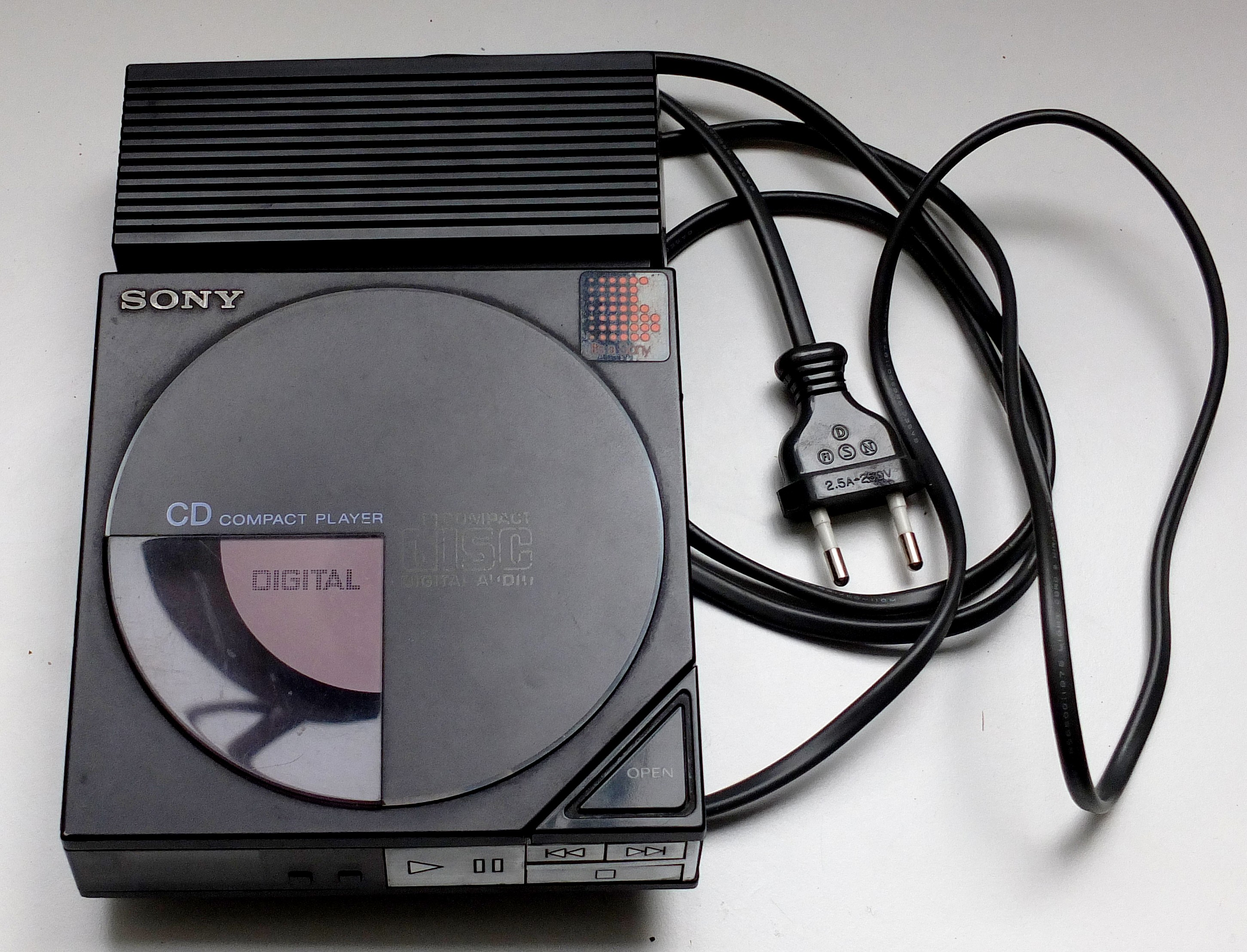
First portable CD player D-50 from 1984

In 1979, Sony released the world's first portable music player, the Walkman, bundled with the MDL-3L2 headphones. This line fostered a fundamental change in music listening habits by allowing people to carry music with them and listen to music through lightweight headphones. Originally used to refer to portable audio cassette players, the Walkman brand has been widely adopted by the company to encompass its portable digital audio and video players as well as a line of former Sony Ericsson mobile phones.

In October 1982, Sony introduced the CDP-101, the world's first commercially available Compact Disc player. Its commercial success demonstrated the viability of digital audio, effectively initiating the transition away from vinyl records and cassette tapes.

In November 1984, Sony released the D-50, the world's first portable Compact Disc player. In late 1985, Sony released the D-50 Mk II, marking the official launch of the Discman brand name printed directly on the chassis. In 1997, Sony officially retired the Discman brand and rebranded its portable CD player lineup under the CD Walkman name.

In 1999, Sony's first portable digital audio players were introduced; one was a player using Memory Stick flash storage created by the Walkman division, and the other was a smaller pen-sized player with embedded flash storage created by the Vaio division; both accompanied with Sony's OpenMG copyright protection technology and PC software for music transfer. Sony continue to develop Walkman digital audio players, although it was unable to capture the large share and influence in the digital world as it did in the cassette era.

In 2025, a model TPS-L2 cassette Walkman from 1979 was included in Pirouette: Turning Points in Design, an exhibition at the Museum of Modern Art featuring "widely recognized design icons [...] highlighting pivotal moments in design history."

Sony is a major audio products manufacturer and one of the active noise control technology leaders.

Sony's high-end microphones and headphones for professional use are produced at Sony/Taiyo Corporation, a designated special subsidiary at which 67% of employees have a disability, in Ōita Prefecture, Japan.

=== Video ===
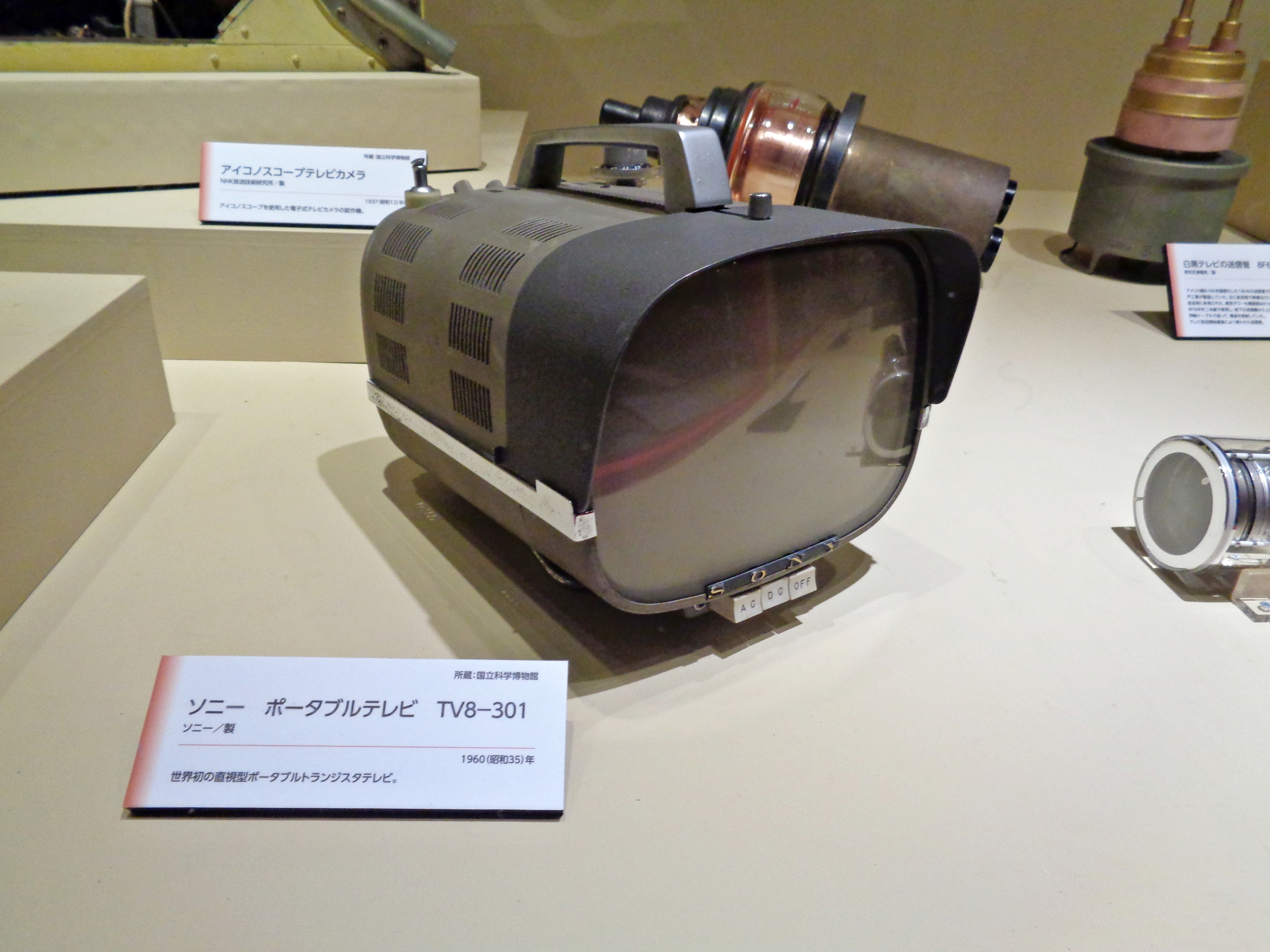
TV8-301, Sony's first television set, 1960

==== Television ====
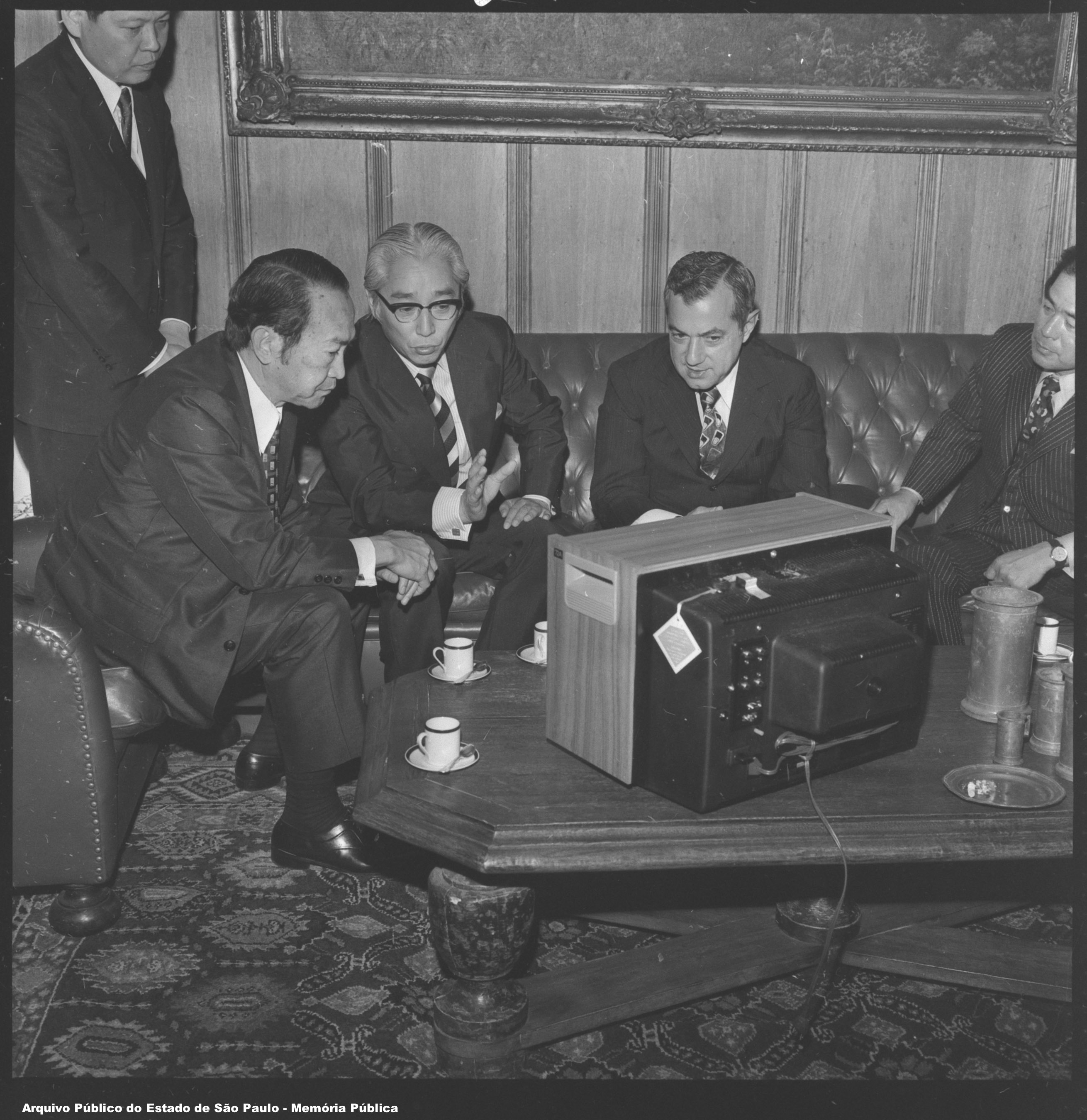
Sony President Akio Morita presents a television model to São Paulo Governor Laudo Natel, 1972

Sony unveiled the TV8-301 in late 1959 and released it in May 1960 as its first television set, which was also the world's first all-transistor portable television. In 1968, the company introduced the Trinitron brand name for its lines of cathode ray tube (CRT) televisions and computer monitors. In 1989, Sony introduced the 43-inch Trinitron PVM-4300, which became the largest commercial CRT television ever manufactured.

In 1997, Sony introduced the flat-screen FD Trinitron series under the WEGA brand, which eliminated glass curvature to minimize image distortion and glare. Sony introduced its first large-screen home LCD television in 2002 with the WEGA KLV-17HR1. The company continued to use the WEGA brand for its LCD and projection televisions until summer 2005, at which point it introduced the Bravia name for its line of high-definition LCD televisions, projection units, and home theater equipment. In 2007, Sony released the 11-inch XEL-1 as the world's first commercial OLED television. In 2008, after a 40-year production run, Sony formally ended global manufacturing of its Trinitron CRT televisions.

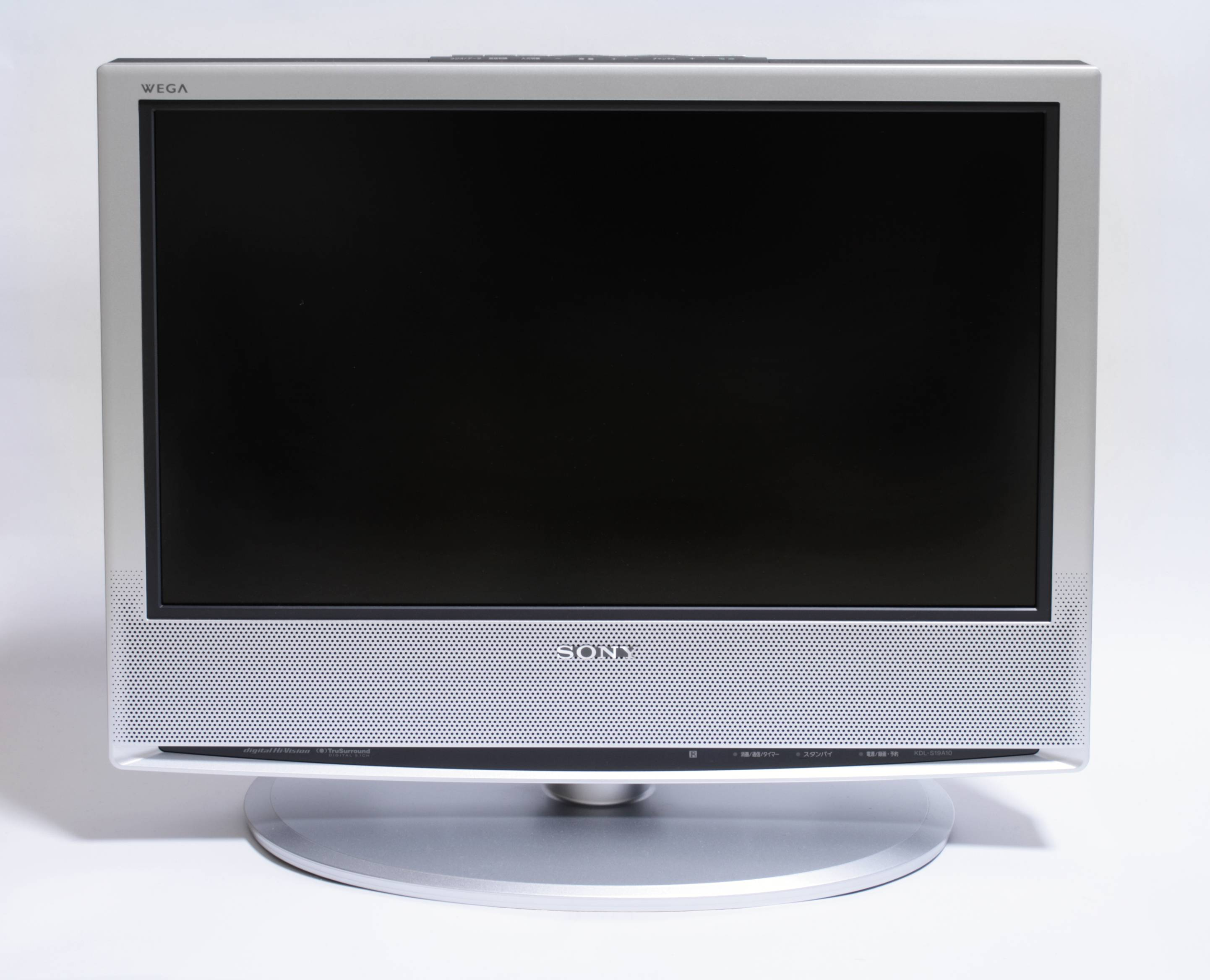
Sony WEGA LCD television

Sony expanded the Bravia range over the following years by adopting several new display formats and software platforms. During the height of 3D home media trends in 2010, the company released its first 3D-capable Bravia LCD HDTVs utilizing active-shutter glasses. That same year, Sony introduced the first HDTV that used the Google TV operating system, as well as the Bravia KDL22PX300, which featured an integrated PlayStation 2 console built into its base. In 2012, Sony debuted its first 4K Ultra HD television, the 84-inch XBR-84X900. Starting in 2015, Sony transitioned its entire smart TV software ecosystem to Android TV. In 2017, the company introduced its consumer OLED Bravia models. In 2019, Sony launched its first 8K Ultra HD television, the ZG9. In 2022, Sony introduced the Bravia XR A95K, which was the world's first commercially available consumer television to use QD-OLED panel technology. In 2024, Sony overhauled its entire naming convention to simplify model tiers, designating its lineup under single-digit identifiers such as the Bravia 3, Bravia 7, Bravia 8 and Bravia 9. In 2026, Sony introduced RGB Mini LED technology in the flagship Bravia 9 II model.

During the height of the CRT era, Sony held a major portion of the global television market, driven by the success of its Trinitron lineup, which captured up to 20% of the television market in certain years. By 2012, intense competition from South Korean rivals such as Samsung and LG, along with rising Chinese manufacturers like TCL and Hisense, reduced its share to under 10% globally, causing consecutive years of business losses. In response, Sony deliberately shifted away from high-volume sales to focus on premium, large-format displays sold at higher price points. Sony's global television market share dropped below 2% by 2025.

==== Watchman ====
In 1982, Sony introduced the Watchman, a line of portable pocket televisions featuring a flat monochrome CRT display. Later models transitioned to full-color LCD. Sony produced over 65 variations before discontinuing the product line in 2000 due to declining demand and the transition to digital broadcasting.

==== Gaming displays ====
Sony developed dedicated gaming displays tailored for its interactive entertainment hardware and PC gaming markets. In late 2011, Sony Computer Entertainment launched the 24-inch PlayStation 3D Display, which featured active-shutter 3D technology and proprietary "SimulView" feature that allowed two players wearing 3D glasses to view distinct, full-screen 2D gameplay images simultaneously from a single screen.

In June 2022, Sony expanded beyond its console accessory line by launching Inzone, a dedicated sub-brand of high-performance gaming monitors and headsets aimed at PC and PlayStation 5 gamers.

==== Professional master monitors ====
Sony built a dominant presence in the film and television production industry by developing dedicated professional master monitors. Under its TRIMASTER brand, Sony produced industry-standard reference displays engineered specifically for colorists, cinematographers, and post-production studios to evaluate raw footage with exact color accuracy and dynamic range. The line evolved from legacy CRT broadcast monitors to high-grade professional OLED panels, such as the BVM-E250 (2011) or the 4K HDR PVM-X2400 (2020).

==== Operations ====
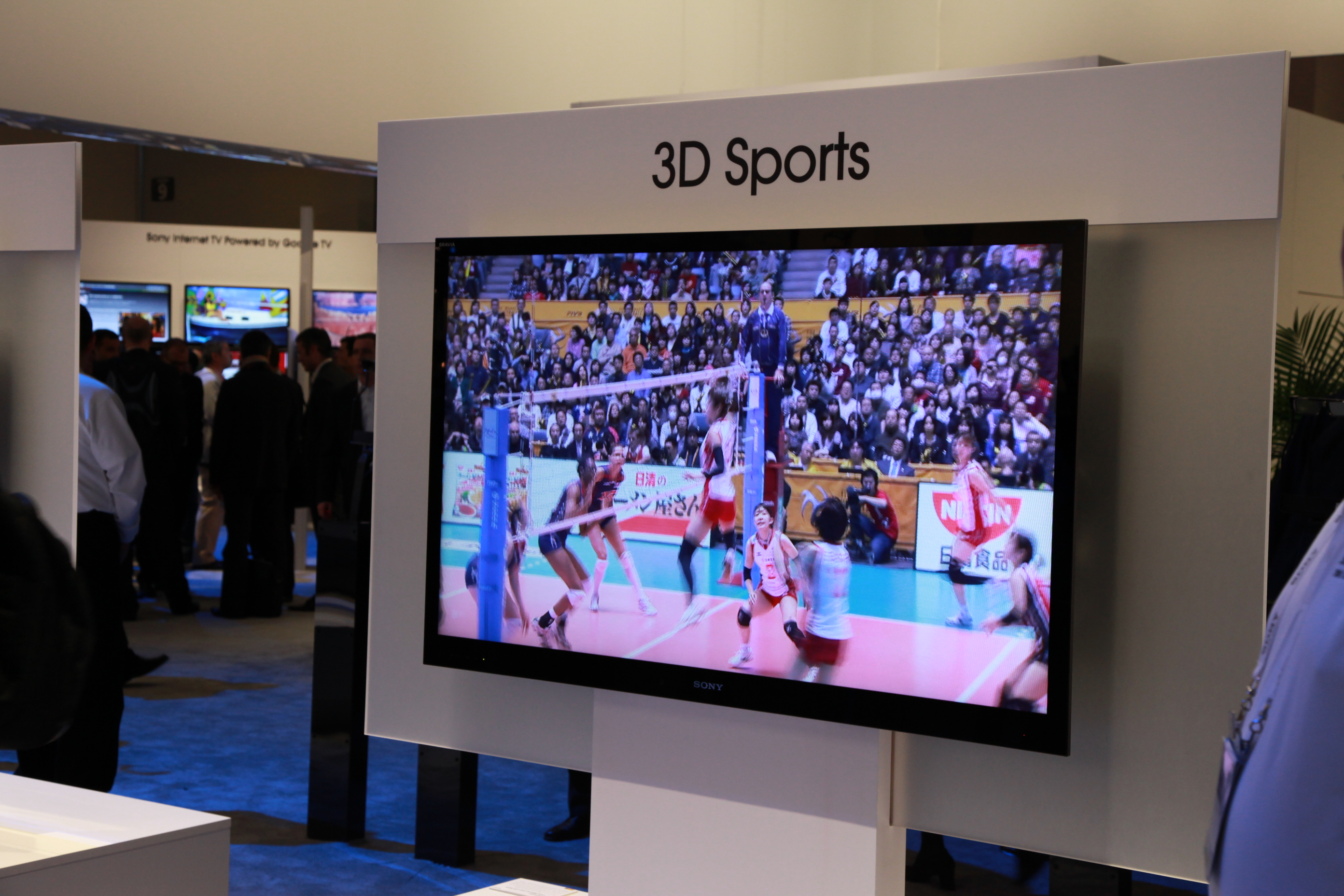
One of Sony's Bravia 3D television's

Sony restructured its television business to reduce operational costs, downsizing internal units and outsourcing display panel production through corporate partnerships. In 2004, Sony established S-LCD Corporation as a major joint venture with Samsung Electronics to produce seventh-generation TFT LCD panels, but later sold its entire 50% stake back to Samsung for approximately $940 million in December 2011. Sony also entered into a joint venture with Sharp Corporation in July 2009 to operate Sharp Display Products Corporation for large-sized LCD panel production, an agreement that was eventually terminated in May 2012 as Sony parted ways. To streamline operations and focus on larger panel applications, Sony merged its small-and-medium LCD business with those of Toshiba and Hitachi to form Japan Display Inc. in 2012. In 2015, Sony integrated its medium-to-large OLED display business unit into JOLED, a joint venture formed alongside Panasonic and Innovation Network Corporation of Japan. JOLED eventually filed for bankruptcy protection and ceased operations in 2023 after failing to achieve commercial profitability against larger competitors.

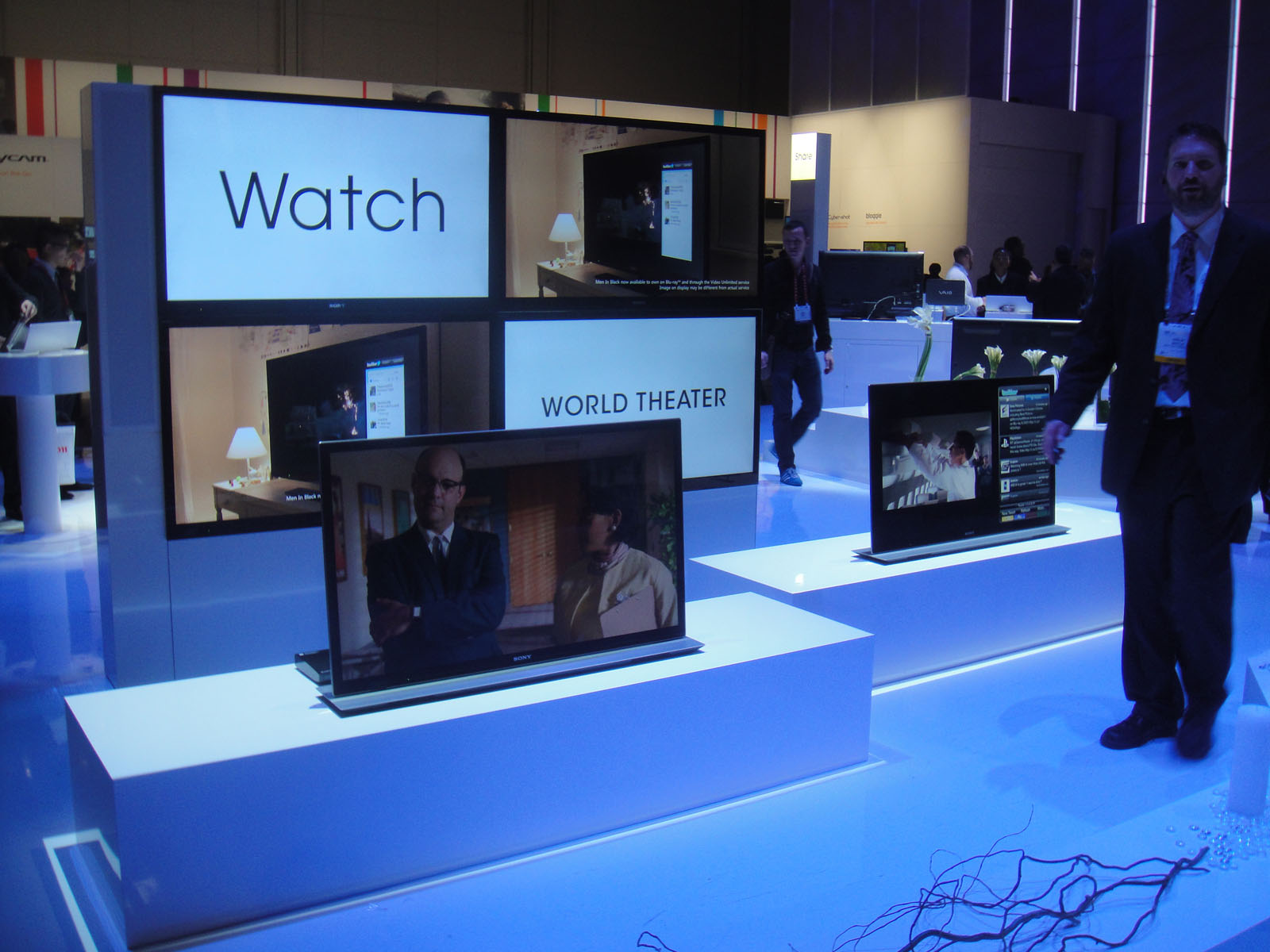
Sony Bravia television, 2012

Since 2017, Sony shifted entirely toward sourcing display panels from external suppliers rather than fabricating them internally. For its premium OLED lineup, Sony partnered directly with South Korean display manufacturers, sourcing WOLED panels from LG Display, while simultaneously purchasing QD-OLED panels from Samsung Display for flagship models such as the A95L series (2023) or Bravia 8 II (2025).

In early 2026, Sony further extended its manufacturing transformation by entering a binding agreement with Chinese TCL Electronics to form a global joint venture named Bravia Inc., scheduled to begin operations in April 2027. Under the agreement, TCL acquired a 51% controlling stake while Sony retained 49%, transferring its entire home entertainment business, including consumer and commercial displays, product development, logistics and global manufacturing assets, to the new entity. Under the agreement, Sony retained control over product design, image processing technology, and brand standards under the Sony and Bravia names.

==== Accolades ====
The logo of Bravia television, styled in all-caps as "BRAVIA". Its backronym is "Best Resolution Audio Visual Integrated Architecture".

Over the decades, Sony's television and monitoring technologies have earned prominent industry recognitions and technical honors. In 1973, Sony’s Trinitron technology received a Technology & Engineering Emmy Award, making it the first Emmy presented to a video display innovation. Flat-panel developments brought further technical accolades, including a 2012 Emmy for the BVM-E250 OLED reference monitor and a subsequent 2021 Emmy award for the 4K HDR BVM-X300, both setting color accuracy standards for professional broadcast and film mastering. In the consumer space, flagship Bravia OLED models have consistently earned top industry titles, including seven consecutive "King of TV" honors at the annual Value Electronics TV Shootout from 2018 to 2025 and multiple EISA Best Product awards.

=== Photography and videography ===
Sony offers a wide range of digital cameras. Its point-and-shoot models are branded Cyber-shot, while DSLRs and mirrorless models are branded Sony α (Sony Alpha). It also produces action cameras and camcorders, with the company's cinema-grade products being sold under the CineAlta and Cinema Line names.

==== Cameras ====
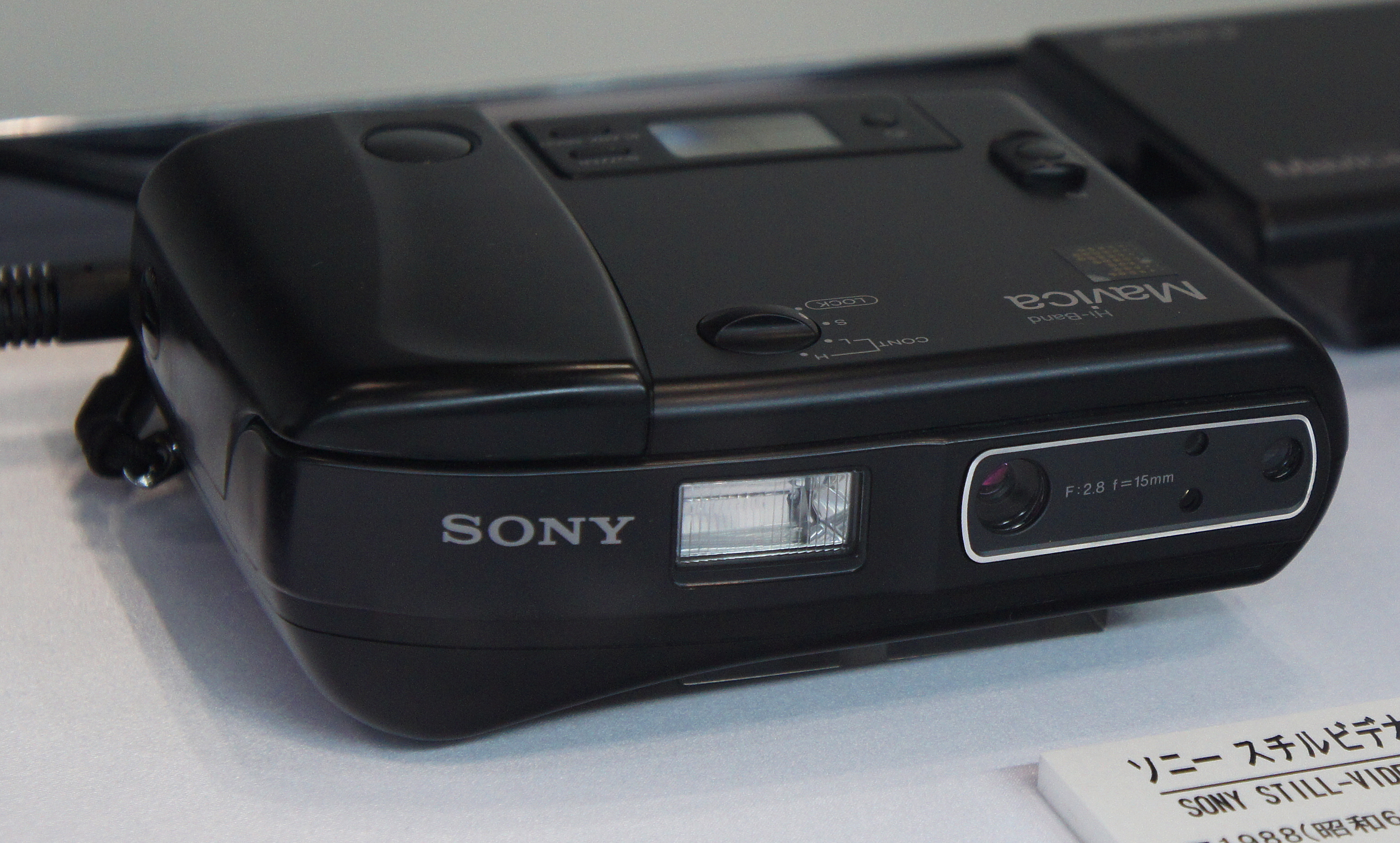
Sony's first commercial consumer camera, the Mavica MVC-C1 (1988)

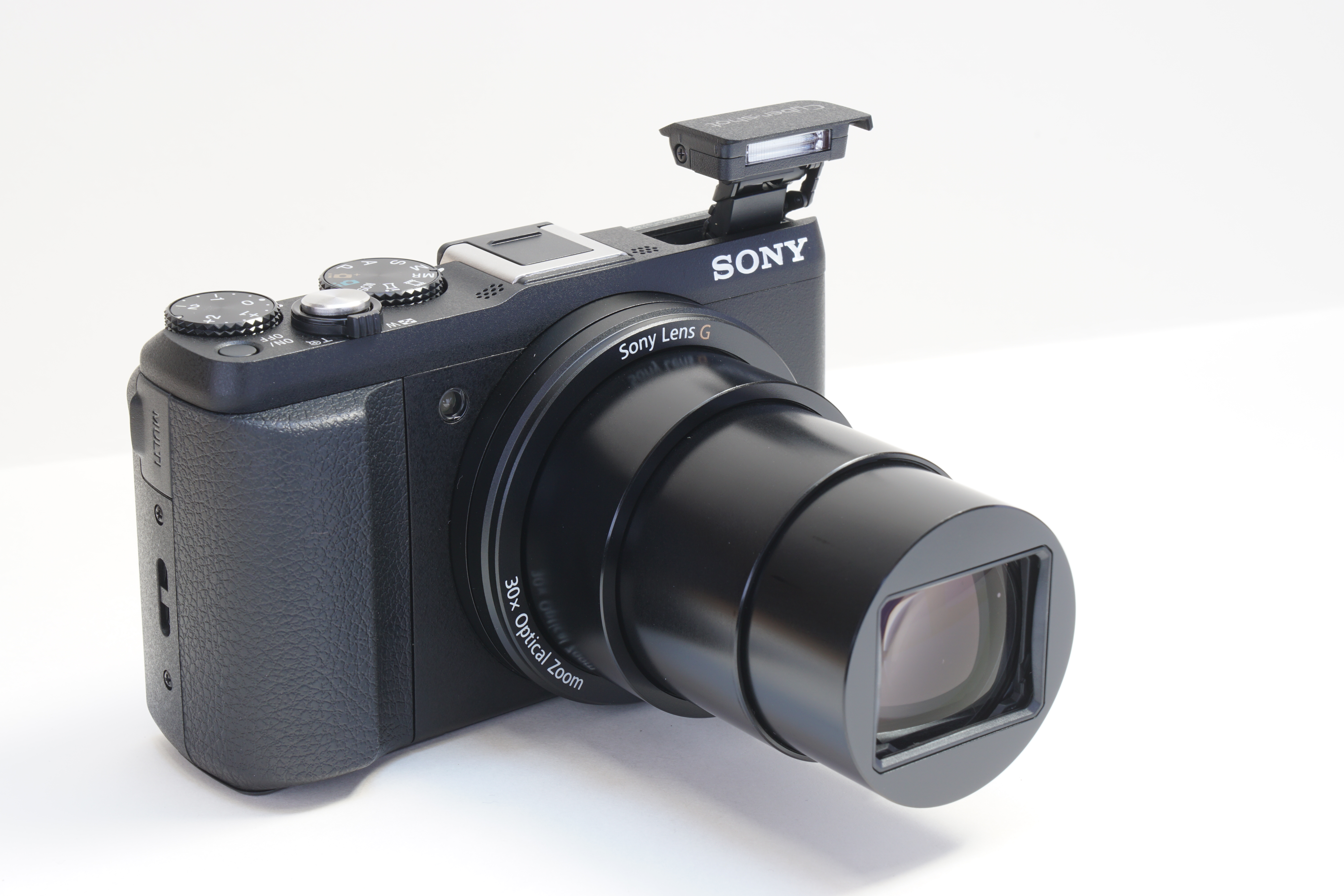
A Sony Cyber-shot digital camera DSC-HX60 (2014)

Sony α7R VI (2026)

Sony entered the electronic image capture market in 1981 by demonstrating a prototype of the Mavica (Magnetic Video Camera), the world's first electronic still camera, which utilized an analog CCD sensor to record video frames onto 2-inch (50.8 mm) proprietary Video Floppy disks developed specifically for the analog Mavica camera. Following news coverage usage during the 1984 Los Angeles Olympics, Sony launched its first commercial consumer model, the Mavica MVC-C1, in 1988.

In 1996, Sony formally entered the true consumer digital camera market with the release of the Cyber-shot DSC-F1. The company expanded its market share throughout the late 1990s with the Digital Mavica series (such as the MVC-FD5 and FD7 in 1997), which recorded standard JPEG image files directly onto PC-compatible 3.5-inch floppy disks, eliminating the need for transfer cables or specialized software.

Alongside the Mavica line, Sony continued to evolve its Cyber-shot family with innovations like the high-end DSC-F505 (1999) featuring a swivel Carl Zeiss zoom lens, and later established dominant compact lines including the ultra-portable P-series, ultra-thin models with internal folded optics (T-series), everyday point-and-shoot cameras (W-series), and high-magnification bridge cameras (H-series).

Sony entered the interchangeable-lens camera market in 2006 by buying Konica Minolta's camera business. Using Minolta's existing A-mount lens system, Sony created the Sony α brand and released its first DSLR camera, the Sony α100.

In 2010, Sony pioneered mirrorless interchangeable-lens technology by launching the NEX-3 and NEX-5 cameras, introducing the compact Sony E-mount system.

In 2012, Sony launched the Cyber-shot RX series, featuring the pocket-sized RX100 and the full-frame RX1, bringing large image sensors to compact cameras.

In October 2013, the company released the α7 and α7R, establishing the world's first full-frame mirrorless camera system.

Lineup of Sony α mirrorless cameras and Sony's G lenses

Backed by its internal image sensor manufacturing division, which produces CMOS sensors for a majority of global smartphone and camera brands, Sony maintained its top-tier market position driven by high-speed full-frame models such as the α9 (2017), the 61-megapixel α7R V (2022) and the global-shutter flagship α1 II (2024). In 2019, Sony surpassed Nikon in global market share to become the world's second-largest digital camera manufacturer, positioning itself directly behind Canon.

As smartphone camera technology diminished global demand for basic point-and-shoot cameras during the 2010s, Sony pivoted its consumer imaging portfolio toward digital content creators and vloggers through the dedicated ZV Series (such as the ZV-1 and ZV-E10).

==== Lenses ====
To complement its camera bodies, Sony built a comprehensive optical development program. Building on its technical partnership with Carl Zeiss AG established in 1996, Sony initially co-developed high-end A-mount and early E-mount lenses under the Zeiss brand.

In 2006, Sony introduced its own high-end Sony G lens series, a line inherited from Minolta's professional optics that expanded from A-mount DSLRs to E-mount mirrorless bodies.

In 2016, Sony introduced its flagship G Master lens series, using advanced glass and fast linear motors to meet high-resolution and speed demands.

==== Camcorders ====
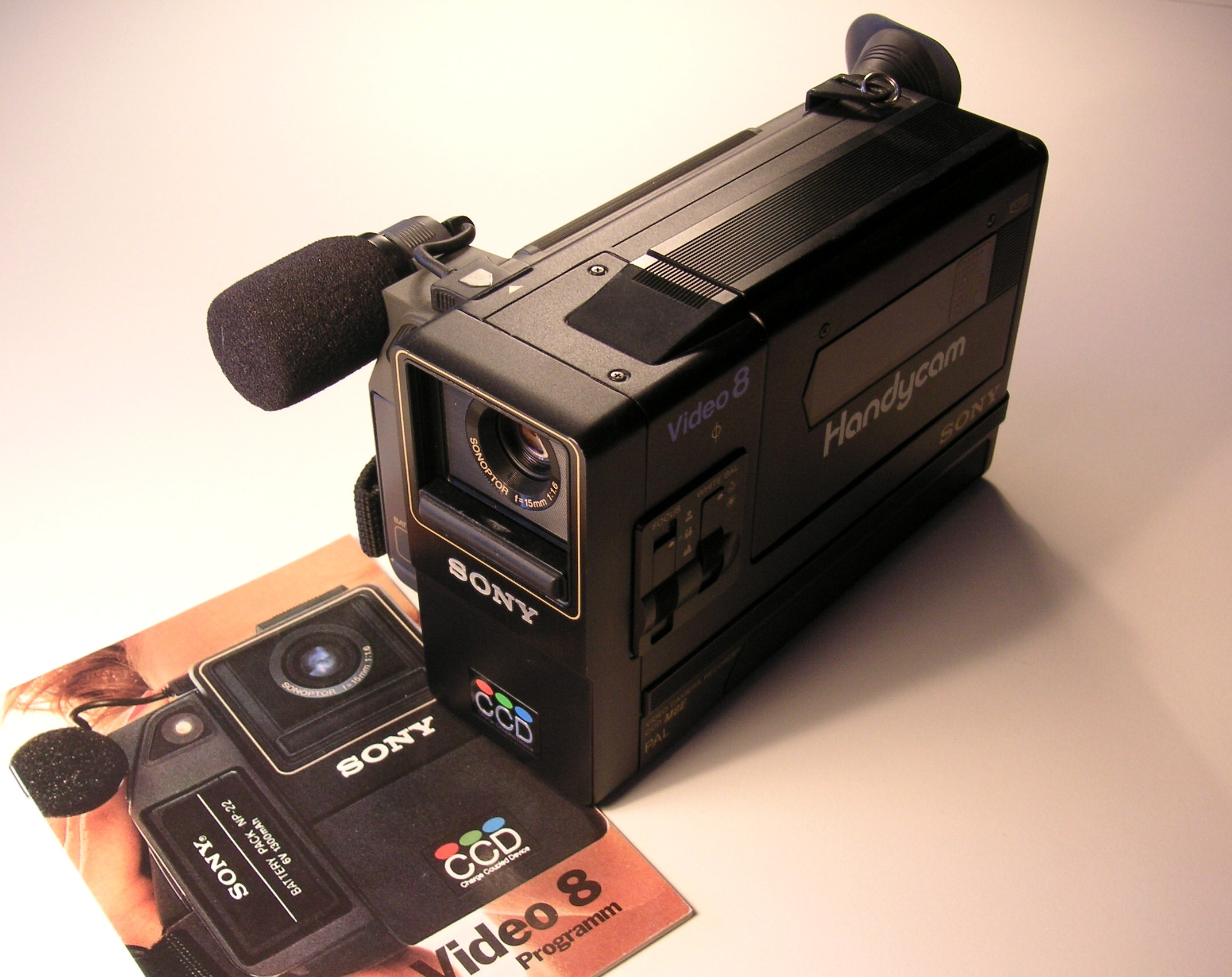
Sony's first Handycam model, the CCD-M8 (1985)

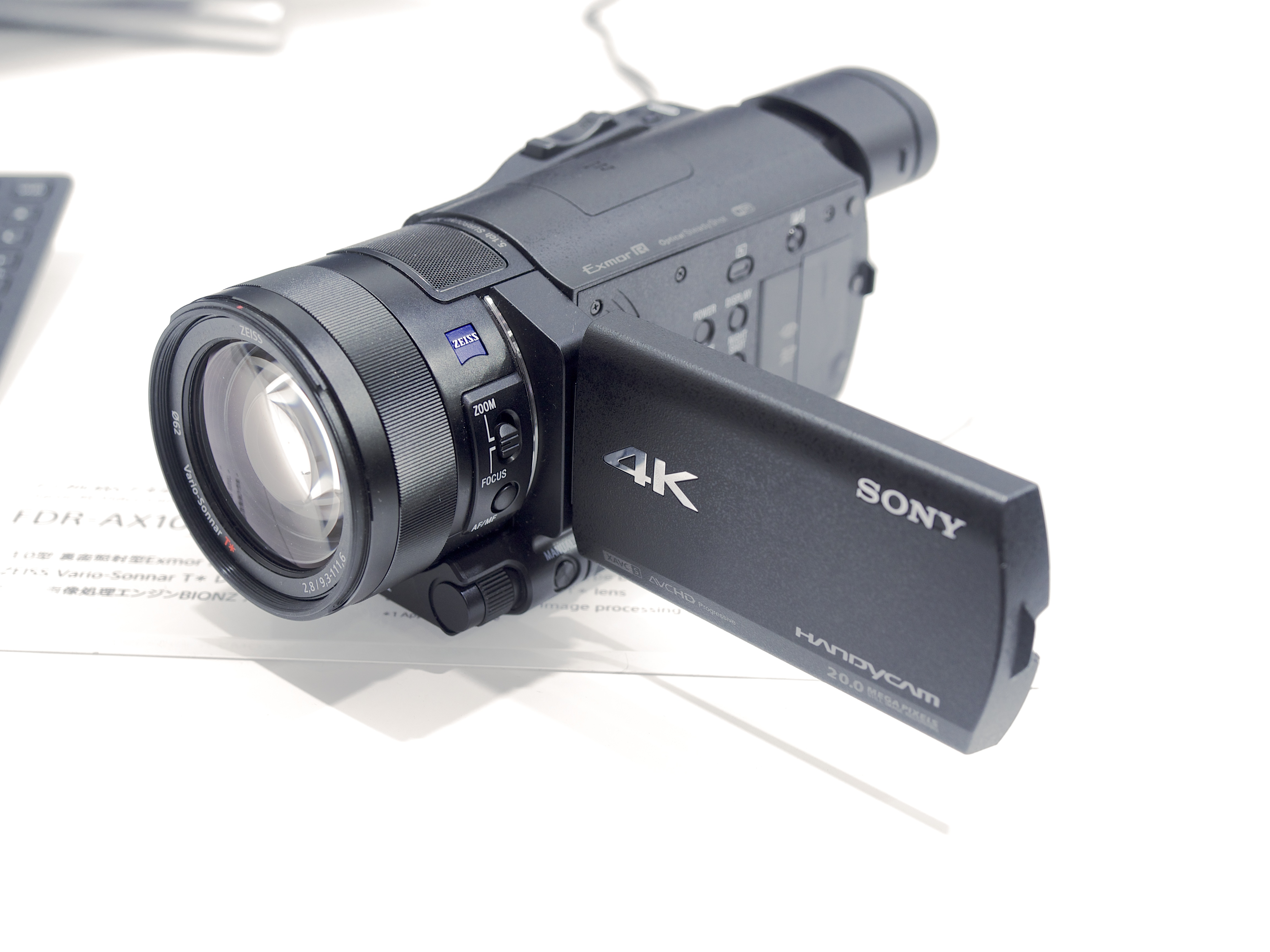
A Sony Handycam FDR-AX100 (2014) 4K camcorder

In 1983, Sony introduced Betamovie, launching the world's first one-piece consumer camcorder format, which utilized standard Betamax cassettes.

Two years later, Sony entered a new era of consumer video recording in 1985 by launching the Handycam brand with the CCD-M8 model. Utilizing the compact 8mm video tape format (Video8), the original Handycam established palm-sized video recording as a global consumer standard, displacing bulky shoulder-mounted video cameras.

Sony continuously updated the Handycam lineup across evolving storage formats, transitioning from Video8 to Hi8 in 1989, Digital8 in 1999, MiniDV, internal hard disk drives and flash memory media.

As smartphone camera advancements diminished global demand for dedicated consumer camcorders during the 2010s and 2020s, Sony scaled back the Handycam lineup to a select few 4K and HD models.

==== Professional broadcast and digital cinema cameras ====
Sony BURANO (2023), an 8K full-frame digital cinema camera from the CineAlta brand line, used on major feature film productions

In 1974, the company released the DXC-1200, a single-tube color studio camera that saw widespread adoption in television production and broadcast TV studios.

Sony entered the professional video recording sector in 1982 with the introduction of the Betacam system, which integrated a video camera and cassette recorder into a single portable unit, establishing a global television broadcast standard for electronic news gathering and field production. Throughout the 1980s and 1990s, Sony supplied broadcast networks worldwide with professional studio cameras and field camcorders across analog and digital formats, including Betacam SP, Digital Betacam (DigiBeta), and HDCAM.

In 1999, Sony established the CineAlta brand for its digital cinema workflow products, introducing high-definition 24p cameras such as the HDW-F900 and HDC-F950. Director George Lucas utilized these early CineAlta models to shoot Star Wars: Episode II – Attack of the Clones (2002), the first major feature film shot entirely on digital video and Episode III – Revenge of the Sith (2005), marking a major milestone in Hollywood’s transition to digital cinematography.

In 2006, Sony introduced XDCAM, replacing traditional tape with optical discs and memory cards for news and documentary production.

In 2020, Sony introduced its Cinema Line for independent filmmakers and solo shooters.

As of 2026, Sony has become the largest manufacturer of professional video cameras, surpassing companies like Blackmagic Design, RED Digital Cinema and ARRI.

=== Mobility ===
==== Mobile phones ====
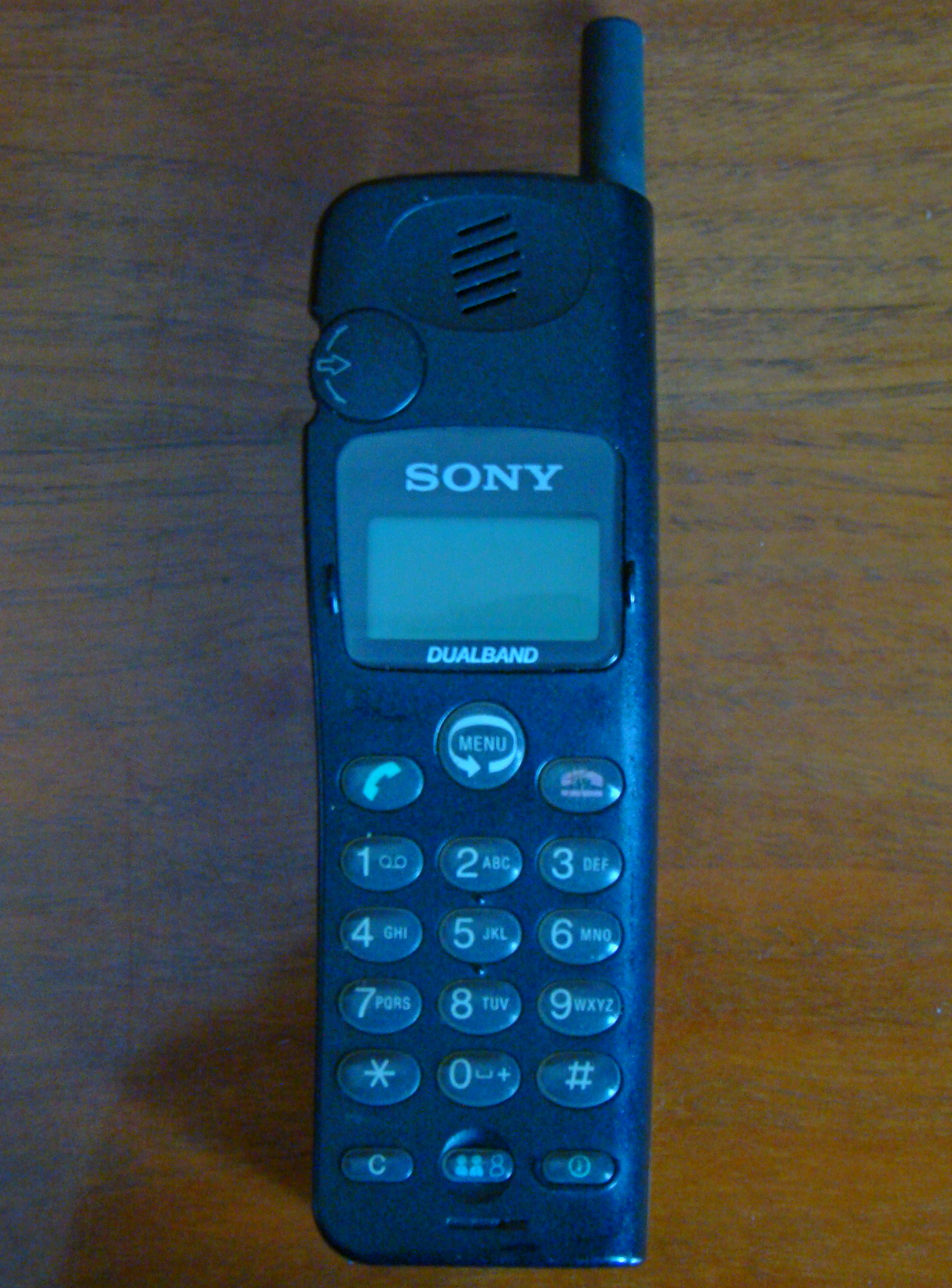
A historical Sony CMD-CD5 mobile phone released in 2000

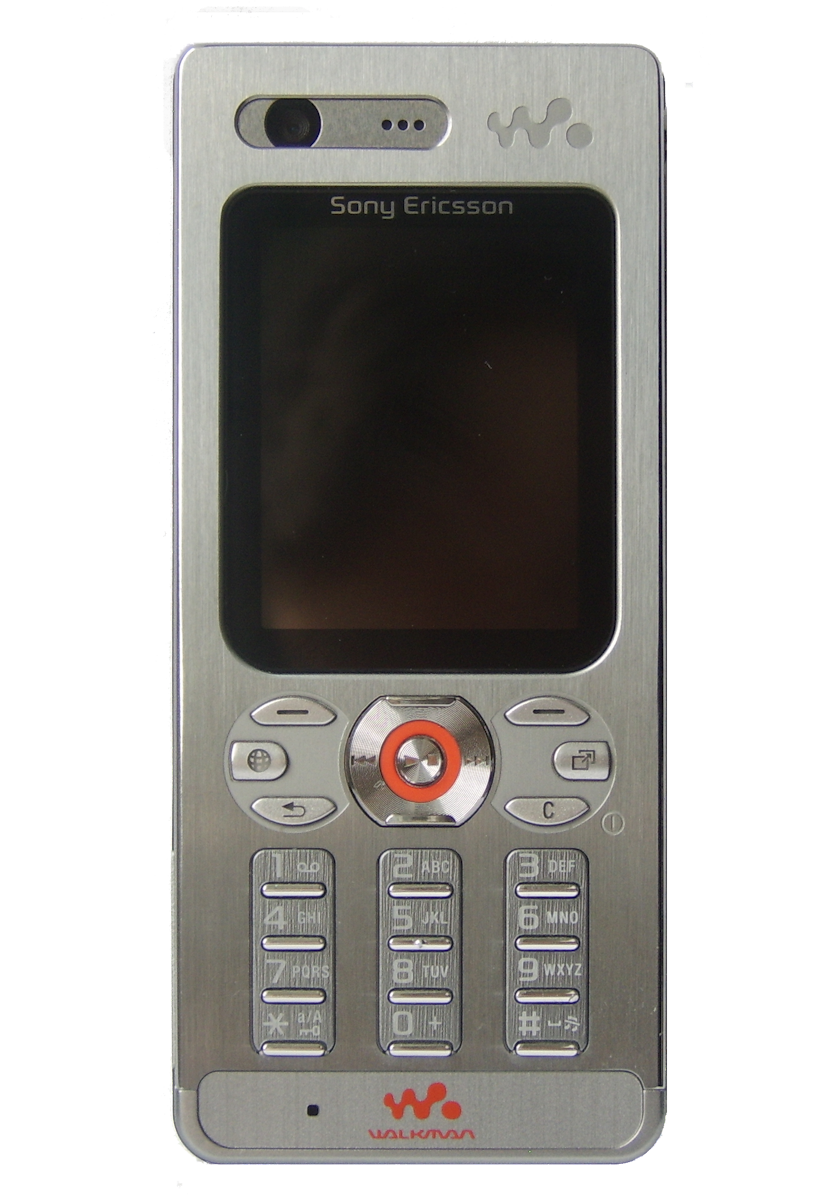
The Sony Ericsson joint venture lasted 10 years, from 2001 to 2011 (Sony Ericsson W880i, 2007)

Sony made its initial entry into the GSM mobile market in the mid-1990s with the CM-DX 1000 (1997) and CM-DX 2000 (1997), which were manufactured by Siemens on behalf of Sony. Shortly after, the company introduced its internally designed CMD series, beginning with the CMD-Z1 (1997), which featured a signature pop-out microphone and a side-mounted jog dial thumbwheel. Later releases in the lineup included the CMD-CD5 (2000), CMD-J5 (2000) and the audio-focused CMD-MZ5 (2001).

To gain scale and access advanced telecommunications network infrastructure, Sony merged its handset operations with Swedish telecommunications giant Ericsson in 2001, forming a 50:50 joint venture named Sony Ericsson Mobile Communications. The joint venture combined Ericsson's engineering expertise in wireless hardware with Sony's consumer electronics branding and industrial design.

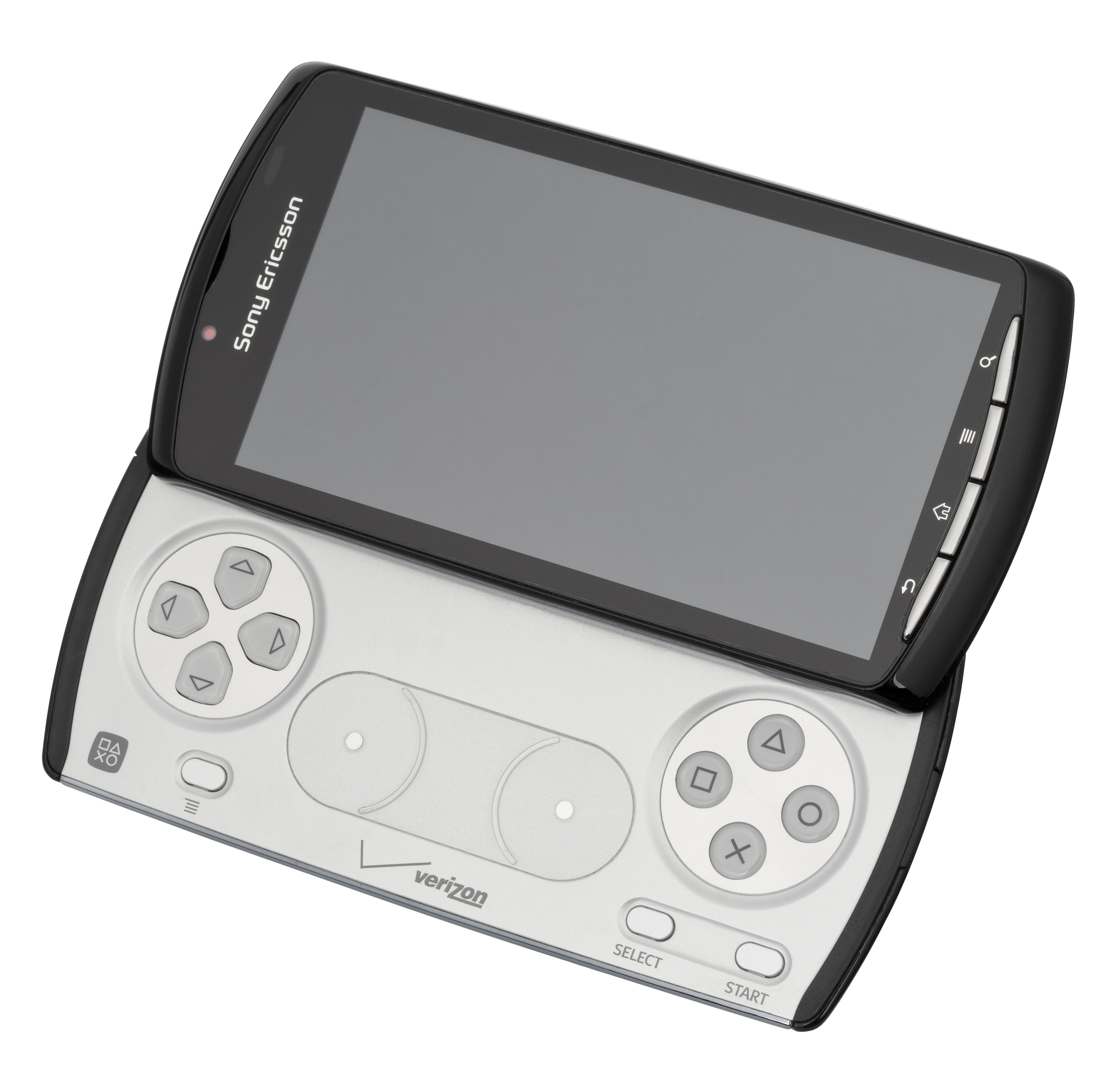
Sony Ericsson Xperia Play (2011), PlayStation-certified smartphone

Initial operations faced financial turbulence, recording operational losses in 2001 and 2002 before turning profitable in 2003. Sony Ericsson distinguished itself by pioneering feature-rich multimedia handsets, most notably establishing the mobile camera phone segment with early VGA and multi-megapixel models, alongside music-centric Walkman-branded devices and imaging-focused Cyber-shot phones.

The company achieved strong sales in the mid-2000s, peaking in 2007 with over 100 million devices sold and a global market share exceeding 9%. However, it struggled during the industry-wide transition to modern capacitive touchscreen smartphones following the introduction of Apple's iPhone in 2007. Although Sony Ericsson was the world's fourth-largest mobile phone manufacturer in 2009 (behind Nokia, Samsung, and LG), its global market share dropped to sixth place by 2010. In 2011, Sony Ericsson had shipped 22 million smartphones.

In 2011, Sony Ericsson released the Xperia Play, which became the world's first PlayStation-certified smartphone, featuring a slide-out gamepad with physical directional controls and dual analog touchpads.

In February 2012, Sony acquired Ericsson’s 50% stake in the venture for over €1.1 billion ($1.5 billion), fully absorbing the division as a wholly owned subsidiary renamed Sony Mobile Communications. Under full corporate ownership, the business shifted exclusively toward smartphones under the flagship Xperia brand. Xperia brand originally debuted in 2008 with the Xperia X1 running Windows Mobile, before transitioning to the Android operating system in 2010 with the release of the Xperia X10. In 2012, the Xperia S became the first smartphone marketed under sole Sony branding.

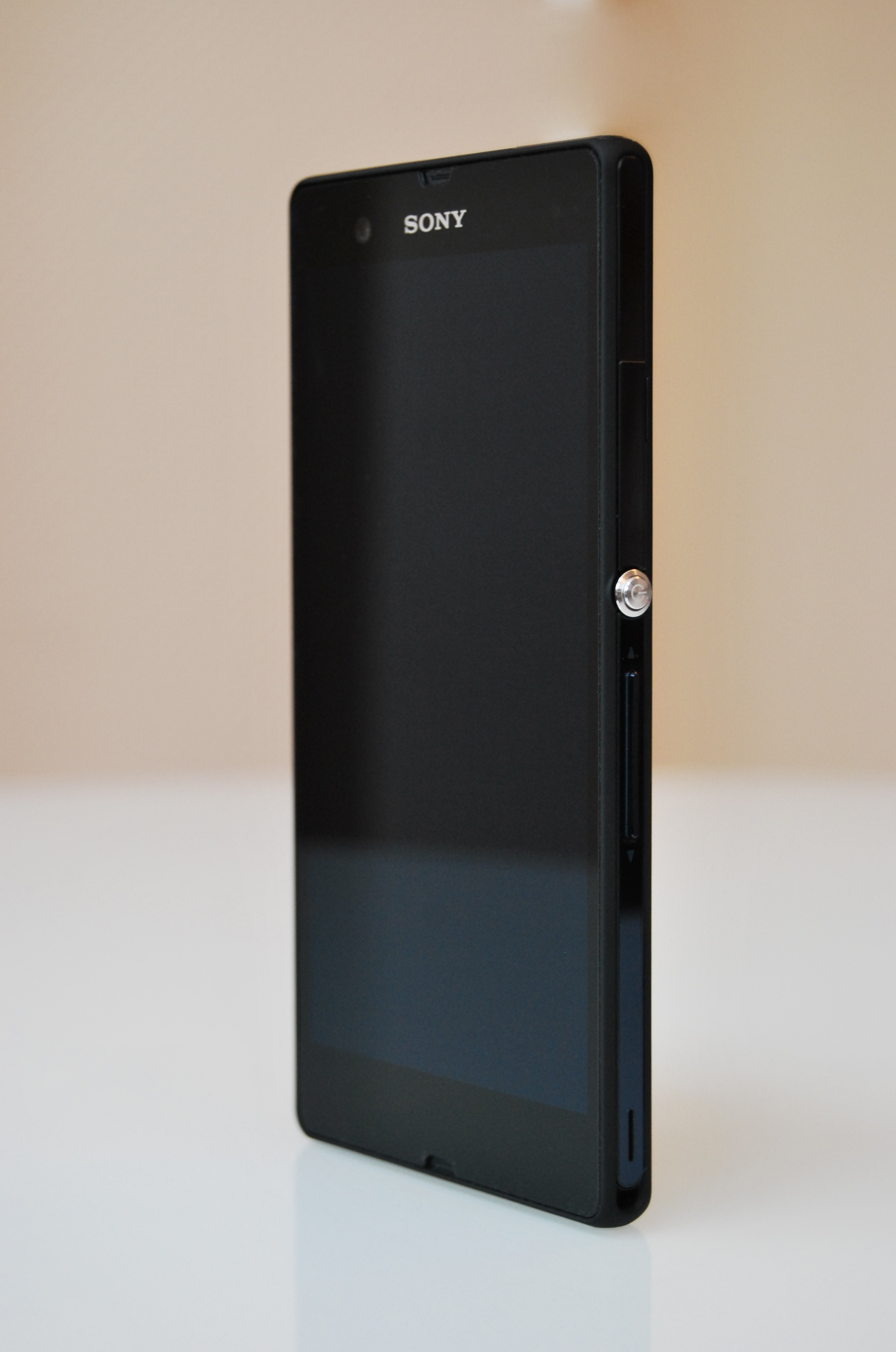
Sony Xperia Z (2013), the first smartphone with a Full HD display

Sony Xperia 1 V (2023), part of the flagship Sony Xperia 1 series

Following its acquisition of full corporate ownership, Sony established several technical milestones under the Xperia brand across display technology, audio engineering and mobile camera optics. In 2013, Sony released the Xperia Z, launching the world's first smartphone equipped with a 5.0-inch Full HD display. In 2015, Sony released the Xperia Z5 Premium, launching the world's first smartphone equipped with a 5.5-inch 4K Ultra HD display. Debuting in 2017, the Xperia XZ Premium featured the world's first 4K HDR smartphone display and a Motion Eye camera capable of recording 960 fps super slow-motion video. In 2019, Xperia 1 introduced the world's first 21:9 CinemaWide 4K HDR OLED smartphone display. In 2021, the Xperia 1 III introduced a variable telephoto lens combined with a dual-PD sensor. In 2022, the Xperia 1 IV debuted the first smartphone camera with continuous optical zoom, using a moving lens mechanism to cover 85 mm to 125 mm.

Sony Mobile accounted for roughly 2% of the global mobile market in 2013 and 2014, with 39 million units sold, before entering a multi-year decline amid intense competition from market leaders Apple and Samsung, as well as fast-growing Chinese manufacturers such as Huawei and Xiaomi. The division shipped 13.5 million units in 2017, falling to 6.5 million in 2018 and approximately 2.9 million in fiscal year 2020.

Xperia, the product device name for a range of smartphones from Sony

In April 2021, Sony fully absorbed Sony Mobile into its broader Entertainment, Technology & Services segment. This corporate restructuring ended the mobile unit's status as a standalone business, fully aligning Xperia hardware and imaging software with Sony's broader consumer electronics and camera division.

Facing declining sales, Sony shifted its mobile business away from the mass market to focus exclusively on high-margin, ultra-premium devices, targeted at niche audiences. Sony shifted its focus entirely to top-tier flagship models, such as the Xperia 1 series, with price points that often exceeded rival flagships, tailored specifically for photography enthusiasts, professional videographers, digital creators and long-time Sony enthusiasts.

==== Smartwatches ====
Sony SmartWatch 2 (2013)

Sony was among the first major manufacturers to enter the modern wearable market, establishing an early presence with the Sony Ericsson LiveView in 2010 as a clip-on companion screen for Android devices.

Following its separation from Ericsson in early 2012, Sony expanded its mobile ecosystem with three generations of wearable hardware released between 2012 and 2014 under the main Sony SmartWatch lineup. The original SmartWatch (2012) and SmartWatch 2 (2013) ran on proprietary micro-OS software, operating primarily as notification screen extensions, music remotes, and camera viewfinders for paired Android smartphones while introducing aluminum frames, dust and water resistance and NFC one-touch pairing. In 2014, Sony released the SmartWatch 3, transitioning to Google's Android Wear platform. It added a built-in microphone for Google Now voice commands, standalone GPS tracking, local music storage, and a sunlight-readable transflective display, allowing users to log workouts and play audio without carrying a phone.

Facing intense competition from Apple, Samsung and Garmin alongside slowing market demand, Sony discontinued the SmartWatch lineup to focus on its experimental Wena series, launched in 2016. Sony's Wena (Wear Electronics Naturally) smart strap series embedded digital connectivity, NFC payment chips and health monitoring sensors directly into a watch band and clasp. Designed to preserve traditional watch aesthetics, it allowed users to attach smart capabilities to virtually any standard analog timepiece. The Wena product line and its associated service infrastructure were officially discontinued in 2026.

==== E-readers ====
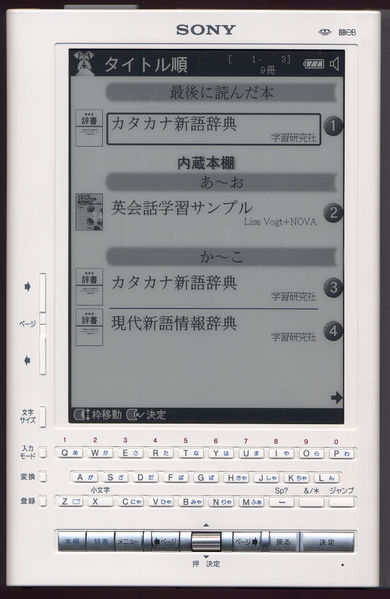
Sony LIBRIé EBR 1000, the first e-reader with E Ink display (2004)

Sony entered the electronic reading market in 2004 with the release of the LIBRIé EBR-1000EP in Japan, introducing the world’s first commercially available device equipped with an E Ink electronic paper display.

In 2006, the company expanded internationally by launching the Sony Reader PRS-500, which featured an unlit paper-like screen capable of high legibility in direct sunlight. Sony followed with the PRS-505 in 2007, refining the hardware design with faster page-turn performance, improved contrast ratios, and a thin, premium aluminum chassis. To support its growing range of hardware, Sony launched the eBook Library software suite alongside the Sony Reader Store in 2006, establishing a digital commerce storefront for purchasing commercial books, magazines and newspapers. In 2008, Sony released the PRS-700, becoming one of the first manufacturers to incorporate an integrated touch-sensitive screen and a built-in LED front-lighting system into a commercial e-reader. The company further broadened its product portfolio between 2009 and 2011 by introducing distinct Pocket, Touch and Daily Edition models, which introduced embedded 3G cellular wireless connectivity.

Unlike Amazon’s proprietary Kindle ecosystem, the Sony Reader series emphasized broad compatibility with open digital publishing standards, offering native support for EPUB, PDF and BBeB file formats. Following the release of the Android-based PRS-T1, PRS-T2 and final PRS-T3 models, Sony encountered intense market pressure from Amazon’s rapidly expanding Kindle platform and the widespread adoption of multi-purpose tablet computers.

Sony Reader Store logo

In early 2014, Sony announced the closure of its Reader Store operations across North America, Europe, and Australia as part of a broader corporate restructuring initiative aimed at eliminating non-viable software platforms and refocusing resources on core, profitable business units. To ensure continuous access to digital purchases, Sony coordinated a customer migration plan that transferred existing user accounts, wallet balances and library content to Rakuten’s Kobo platform. Later that same year, Sony officially terminated hardware production of consumer e-readers after determining that low sales volumes no longer justified ongoing hardware and software development.

Following its exit from consumer e-readers, Sony pivoted its electronic paper development toward professional markets with the Sony Digital Paper series, launching large-format, stylus-driven devices such as the DPT-S1 (2013) and DPT-RP1 (2017) designed primarily for reading and annotating PDF documents in corporate, legal and academic environments. Facing mounting competition from more versatile E Ink tablet alternatives, Sony wound down the Digital Paper line in 2020, with official software support concluded by 2025.

=== Computing ===
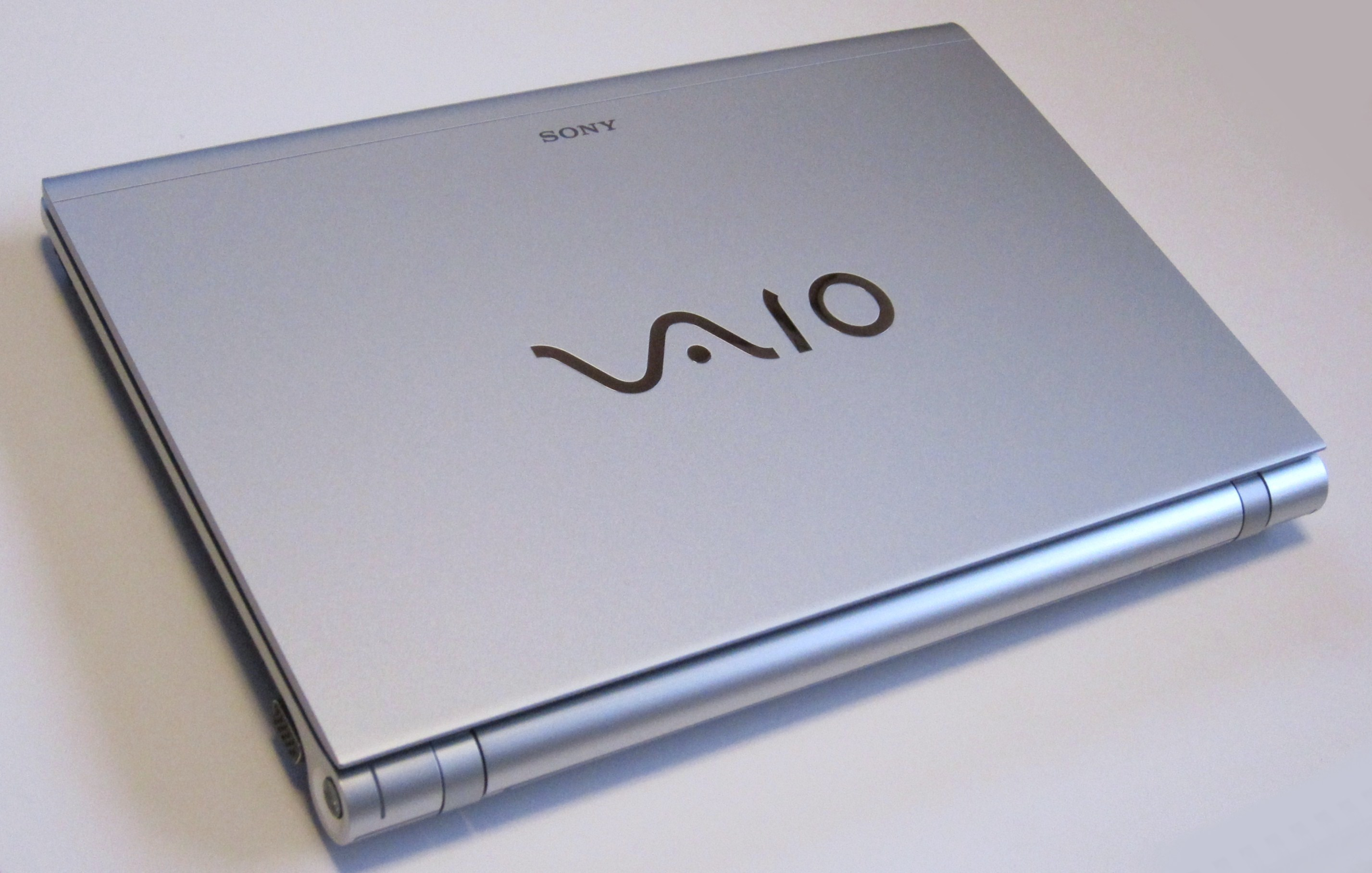
Notebook Sony Vaio. Sony axed its loss-making PC business in 2014.

Sony produced computers (SMC-777 personal computer, MSX home computers and NEWS workstations) during the 1980s. The company withdrew from the computer business around 1990. Sony entered again into the global computer market under the new VAIO brand, began in 1996. Short for "Video Audio Integrated Operation", the line was the first computer brand to highlight visual-audio features.

Sony faced considerable controversy when some of its laptop batteries exploded and caught fire in 2006, resulting in the largest computer-related recall to that point in history.

In a bid to join the tablet computer market, the company launched its Sony Tablet line of Android tablets in 2011. Since 2012, Sony's Android products have been marketed under the Xperia brand used for its smartphones.

On 4 February 2014, Sony announced that it would sell its VAIO PC business due to poor sales and Japanese company Japan Industrial Partners (JIP) will purchase the VAIO brand, with the deal finalized by the end of March 2014. As of 2018, Sony maintained a 5% stake in the new, independent company.

In the 1990s, Sony was contracted to manufacture laptop computers for Apple and Dell. The Raspberry Pi Foundation delegates the manufacture of its single-board computers to Sony. Most Raspberry Pi computers are made at Sony UK Technology Centre in Pencoed, Wales, UK.

=== Robotics ===
==== Consumer robotics ====
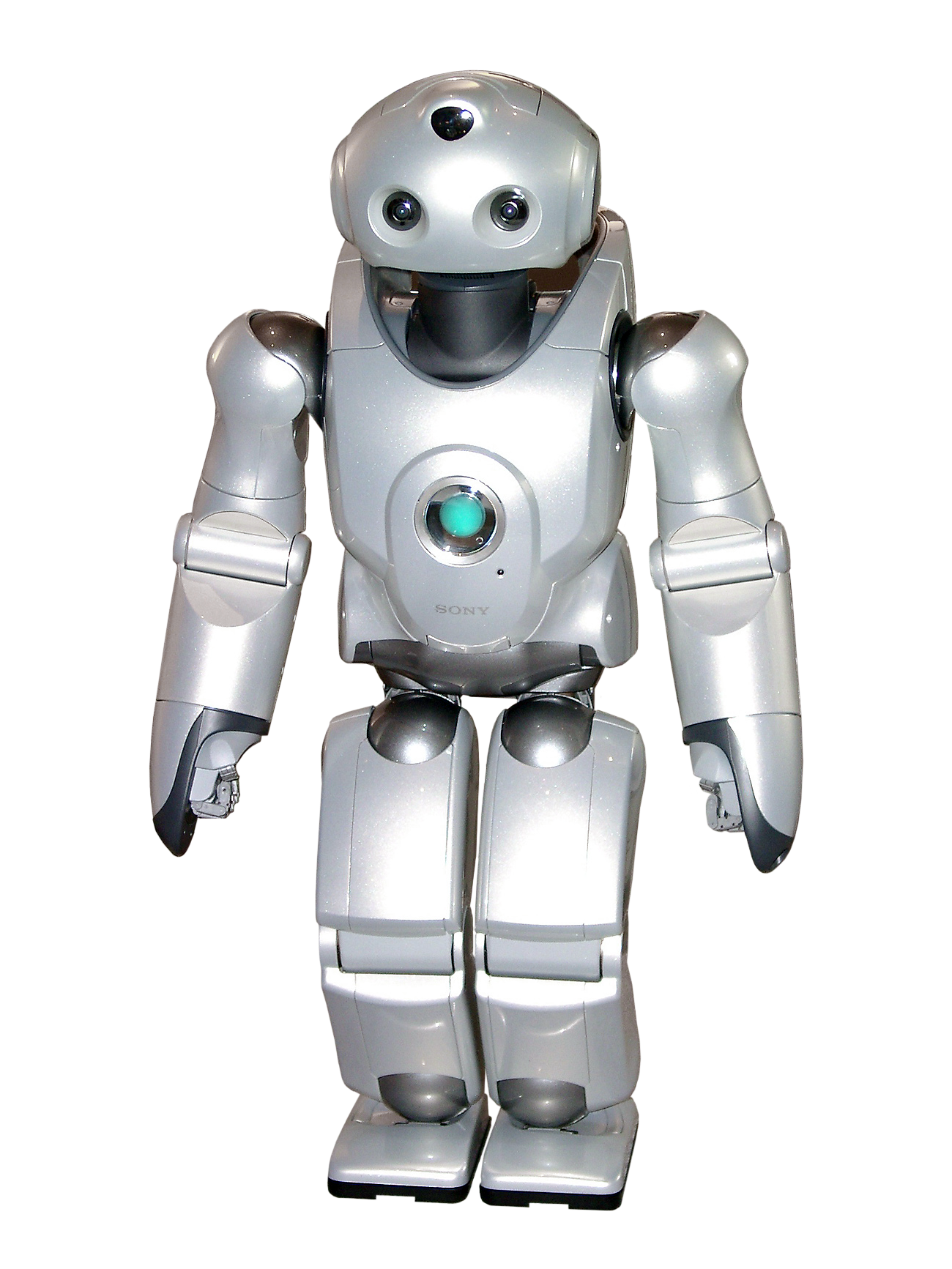
Sony QRIO (2003), a humanoid robot

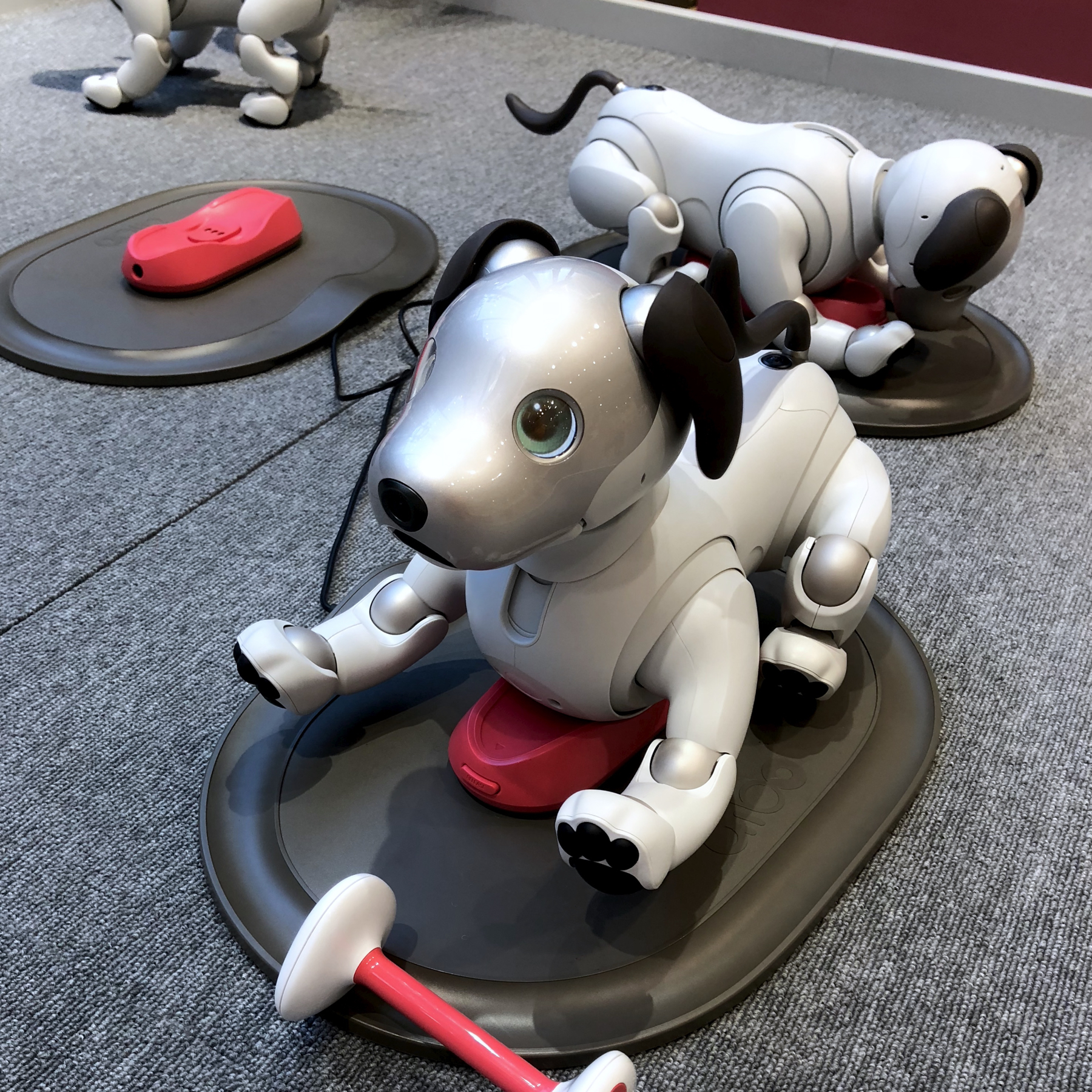
In 2018, Sony launched the AIBO ERS-1000, featuring AI, cloud connectivity and facial recognition

In 1999, the company launched AIBO, an autonomous dog-shaped robotic pet capable of learning, interacting with its environment, and expressing synthetic emotions. Sony expanded its consumer robotics division with the release of QRIO in 2003, a bipedal humanoid robot capable of running, voice recognition, and dancing. In 2007, Sony introduced Rolly, an egg-shaped robotic music player that performed choreographed movements to audio playback.

Following extensive corporate restructuring under CEO Howard Stringer in 2006, Sony shuttered its robotics development, ending AIBO production and shelving the commercial release of QRIO to reallocate capital toward core consumer electronics.

After a ten-year hiatus, CEO Kaz Hirai announced in 2016 that Sony would re-enter the field of AI-driven consumer robotics. In 2018, the company officially launched a modernized iteration of AIBO (ERS-1000), incorporating deep-learning neural networks, cloud connectivity, integrated image sensors and facial recognition technology.

==== Drones ====
Sony expanded into unmanned aerial mobility in 2015 by partnering with autonomous driving startup ZMP Inc. to form Aerosense Inc., a joint venture focused on developing industrial vertical takeoff and landing drones and cloud-based aerial image processing systems for commercial surveying and inspection.

In November 2020, Sony announced its independent consumer and professional drone division under the brand name Airpeak. At CES 2021, the company unveiled the Airpeak S1, designated as the world's smallest drone capable of carrying a full-frame Sony Alpha mirrorless camera system, targeting professional filmmakers and aerial photographers.

Facing strong market competition and low sales volume, Sony announced in late 2024 that it was exiting the drone market, officially discontinuing sales of the Airpeak S1 and its related hardware ecosystem by March 2025.

== Healthcare and biotechnology ==
Sony has targeted medical, healthcare and biotechnology business as a growth sector in the future. The company acquired iCyt Mission Technology, Inc. (renamed Sony Biotechnology Inc. in 2012), a manufacturer of flow cytometers, in 2010 and Micronics, Inc., a developer of microfluidics-based diagnostic tools, in 2011.

In 2012, Sony announced that it would acquire all shares of So-net Entertainment Corporation, the largest shareholder of M3, Inc., an operator of portal sites (m3.com, MR-kun, MDLinx and MEDI:GATE) for healthcare professionals.

On 28 September 2012, Olympus and Sony announced that the two companies will establish a joint venture to develop new surgical endoscopes with 4K resolution (or higher) and 3D capability. Sony Olympus Medical Solutions Inc. (Sony 51%, Olympus 49%) was established on 16 April 2013.

On 28 February 2014, Sony, M3 and Illumina established a joint venture called P5, Inc. to provide a genome analysis service for research institutions and enterprises in Japan.

== Network Services ==
Sony Network Communications is a Sony Group company focused on Internet connectivity, telecommunications, network infrastructure and digital services. The company traces its origins to Sony Communication Network, established in 1995, which launched the So-net Internet service in 1996. The company was renamed So-net Entertainment in 2006, So-net Corporation in 2013, and Sony Network Communications in 2016.

The company's consumer business is centered on Internet and communications services in Japan. Its best-known brands include So-net and NURO, which provides high-speed fiber-optic Internet and mobile services. Sony has developed NURO as a major component of its network-services business, expanding its subscriber base and geographic coverage while increasing the range of services offered around its connectivity infrastructure.

== Imaging & sensing solutions ==
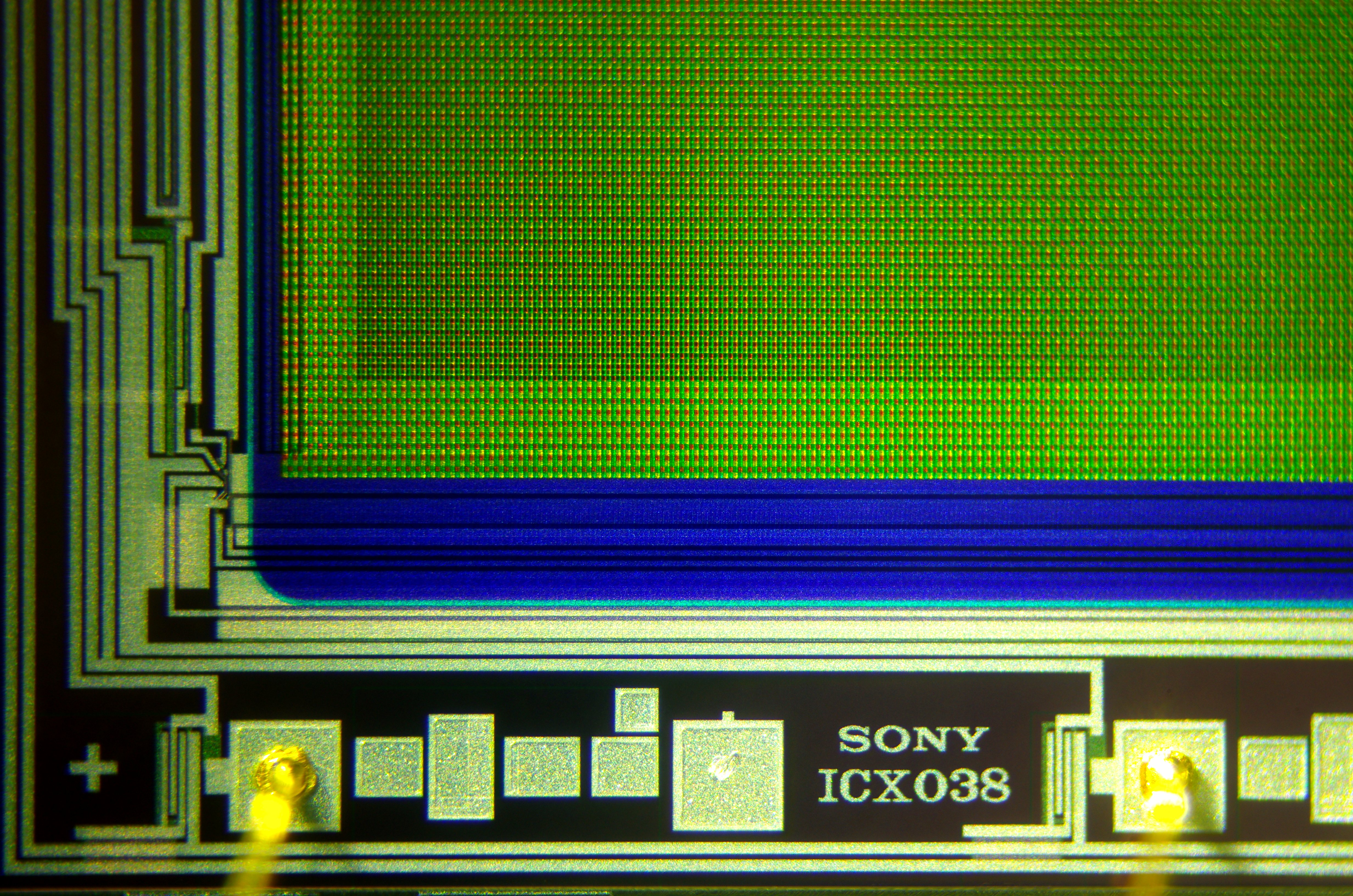
A close-up of a Sony ICX038 CCD image sensor

Sony traces its roots in the semiconductor business back to 1954, when it became the first Japanese company to commercialize the transistor, invented and licensed by Bell Labs, whilst some of the biggest and well-established names in Japan at the time like Toshiba and Mitsubishi Electric initially stuck with vacuum tubes they had been thriving on; despite being an expert on the vacuum tube himself, Ibuka saw potential of the novel technology and had Morita negotiate the terms for licensing, making Sony into one of the earliest and the youngest licensees of the transistor, together with Texas Instruments. In 1957, Sony employee Leo Esaki and his colleagues invented a tunnel diode (usually referred to as Esaki diode) by which they discovered the quantum tunneling effect in solids, for which Esaki received the Nobel prize in Physics in 1973. Sony has commanded a dominant share in the charge-coupled device market.

As of 2020, Sony is the world's largest manufacturer of CMOS image sensors as its chips are widely used in digital cameras, tablet computers, smartphones, drones and more recently, self-driving systems in automobiles.

As of 2020, the company, through its chip business arm Sony Semiconductor Solutions, designs, manufactures, and sells a wide range of semiconductors and electronic components, including image sensors (HAD CCD, Exmor), image processors (BIONZ), laser diodes, system LSIs, mixed-signal LSIs, emerging memory storage, emerging displays (microLED, microOLED, and holographic display), multi-functional microcomputer (SPRESENSE), etc.

In 2020, Sony has launched the first intelligent vision sensors with AI edge computing capabilies.

== Automotive industry ==
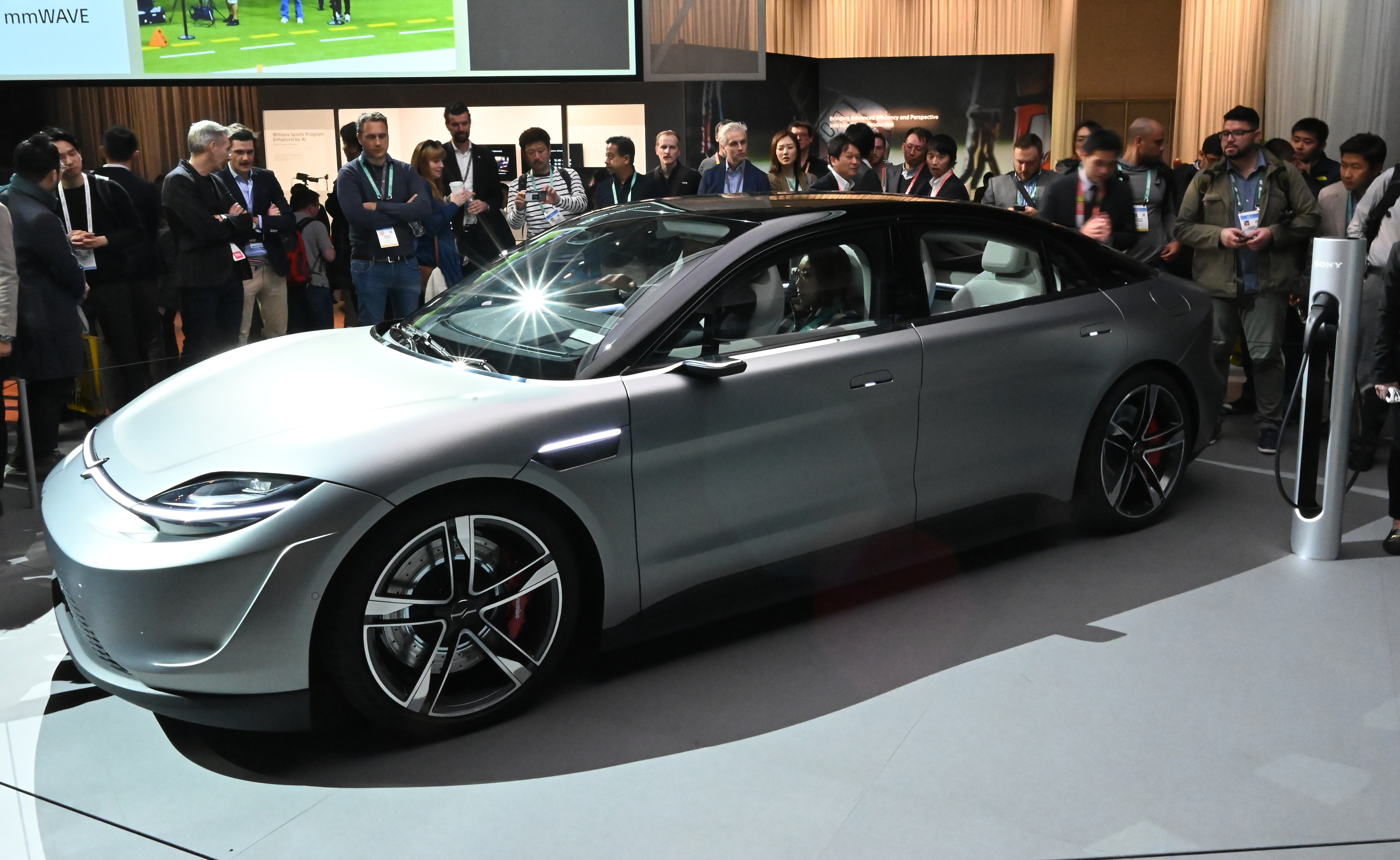
Sony Vision S (2020) concept car

The Sony Vision-S initiative began at CES 2020 as an electric concept vehicle designed to showcase Sony’s advanced imaging, sensing, and entertainment technologies for the automotive industry. The project debuted with the reveal of the Vision-S 01, a fully functional mid-size electric fastback sedan powered by dual 200 kW electric motors that delivered a 0–100 km/h acceleration time of 4.8 seconds and a top speed of 240 km/h (150 mph).

Designed with an emphasis on autonomous driving safety and immersive cabin features, the car showcased panoramic display screens, 360-degree audio systems, and a complex sensor network forming a protective "Safety Cocoon" around the vehicle. Initially launched with 33 sensors to demonstrate Sony’s hardware, the suite was expanded to 40 sensors by CES 2022, alongside the introduction of the 7-seater Vision-S 02 SUV concept.

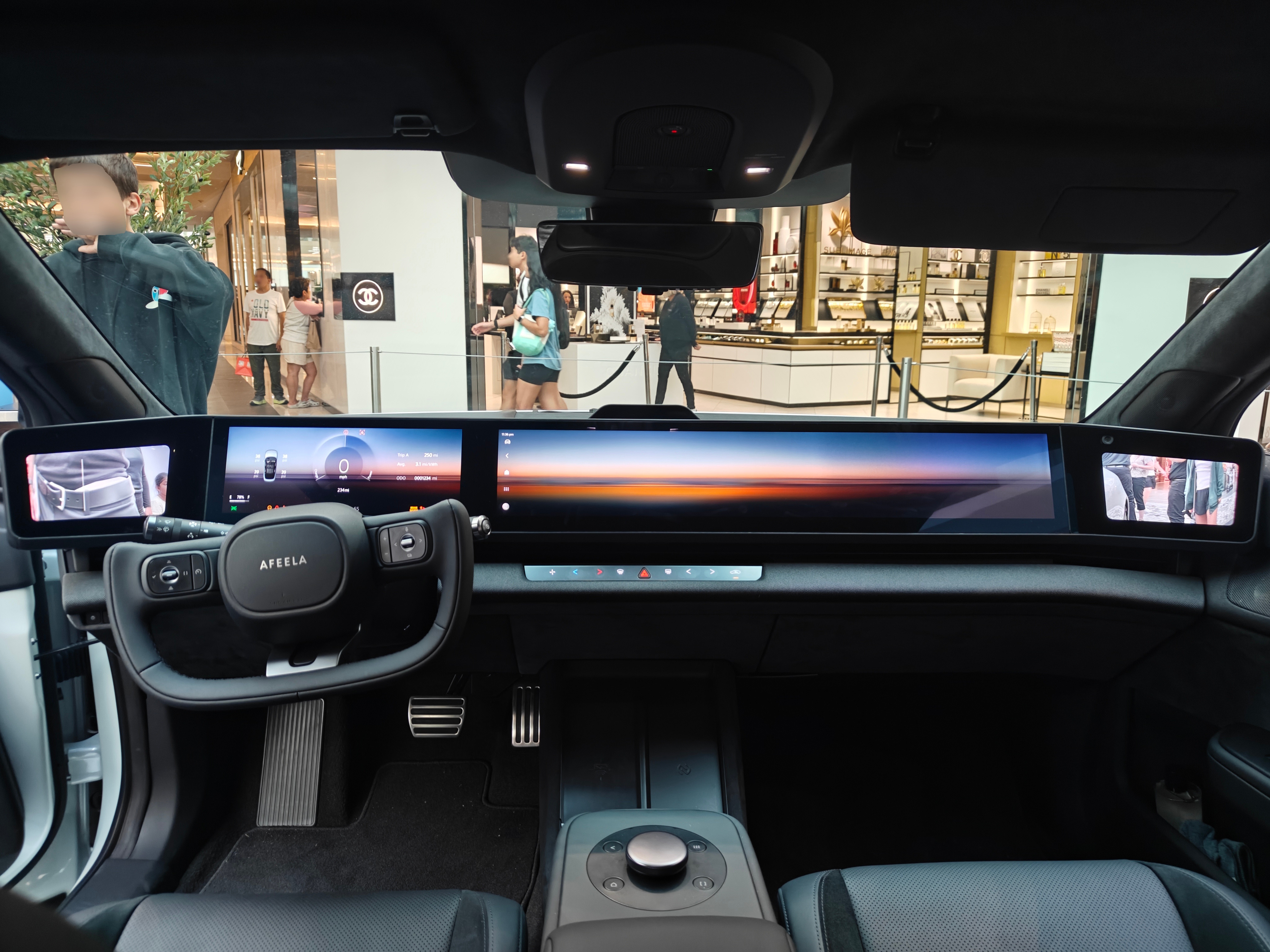
Afeela 1 (2025) interior

Following the strong interest generated by the prototypes, the project transitioned into a commercial venture. In March 2022, Sony partnered with Honda to establish Sony Honda Mobility, evolving the Vision-S foundation into a consumer-focused EV brand called Afeela. Designed around Qualcomm’s Snapdragon Digital Chassis and featuring deep PlayStation and spatial audio integration, the line was anchored by the Afeela 1 sedan.

The initiative expanded at CES 2026 with the reveal of the Afeela Prototype 2026 electric SUV concept, which was planned for release in 2028. However, on March 25, 2026, Sony Honda Mobility officially cancelled production of the Afeela 1 and its SUV program following Honda's strategic retreat from its underlying EV platforms.

=== Car audio ===
Sony partnered with Chery to provide OEM car audio for vehicles such as the Tiggo 8 and Tiggo 9, Ford to provide OEM audio for its vehicles such as the F-150, Fiesta, Focus, Mondeo and Taurus, Jaecoo with the Jaecoo 7, Omoda with their Omoda 5 and Omoda 9, Toyota with their Avensis and the Celica, Volkswagen with their Golf, Passat and also the Polo. A specialist Sony Xplod audio system was fitted to the Ford GTX1 supercar. Sony currently produces aftermarket car audio with its Mobile ES series.

=== Batteries ===
A company behind the commercialization of lithium-ion battery, Sony had been exploring the possibility to manufacture the batteries for electric vehicles. In 2014, Sony participated within NRG Energy eVgo Ready for Electric Vehicle (REV) program, for EV charging parking lots. However, the company then decided to sell its lithium-ion battery business to Murata Manufacturing in 2016.

== Video game industry ==
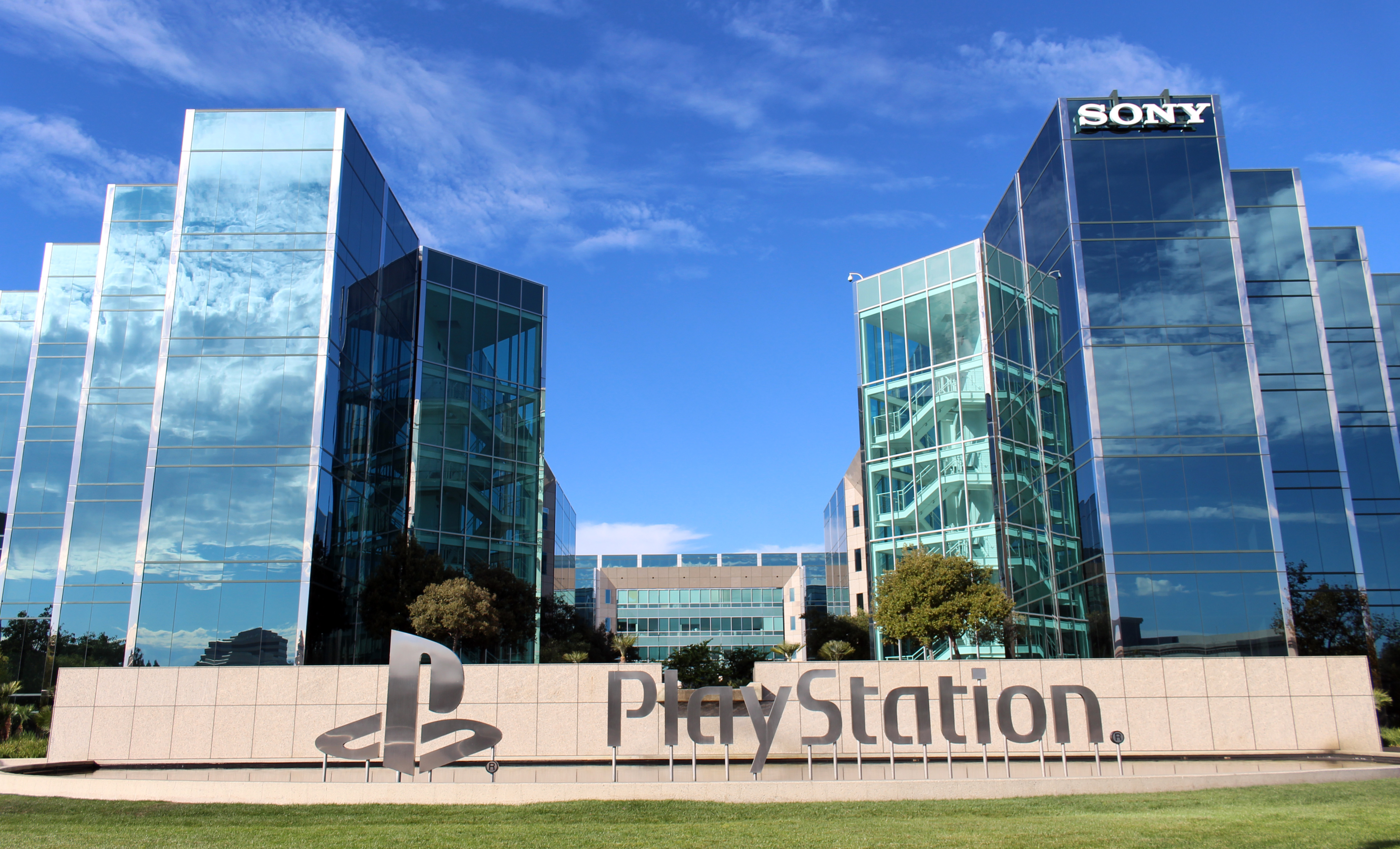
Sony Interactive Entertainment headquarters in San Mateo, California

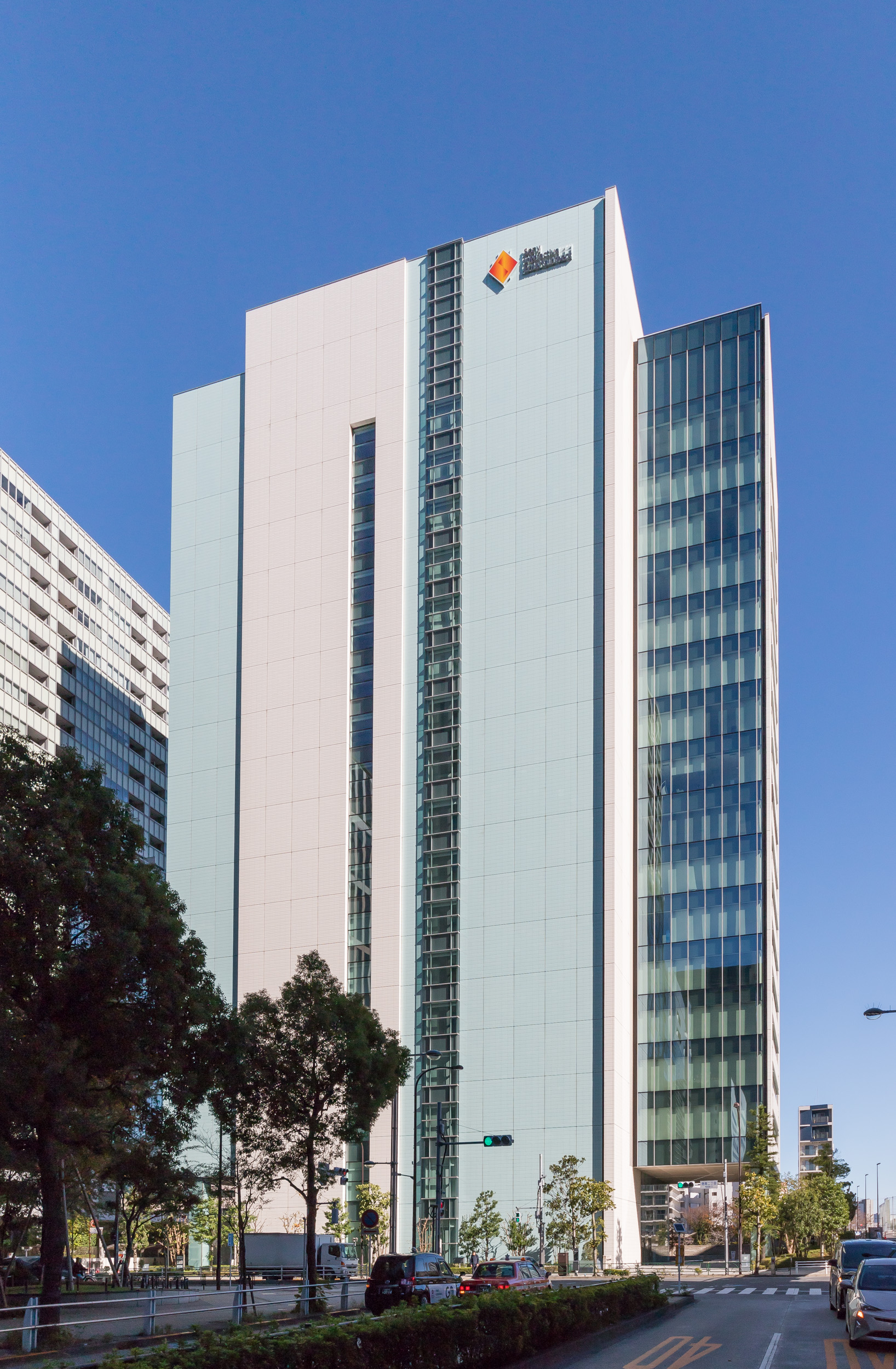
Sony Interactive Entertainment office in Minato, Tokyo

Sony Interactive Entertainment (formerly Sony Computer Entertainment) is most notable for producing PlayStation consoles. The line grew out of a failed partnership with Nintendo.

Until 1991, Sony had little direct involvement with the video game industry. The company supplied components for other consoles, such as the sound chip for the Super Famicom from Nintendo, and operated a video game studio, Sony Imagesoft. As part of a joint project between Nintendo and Sony that began as early as 1988, the two companies worked to create a CD-ROM version of the Super Famicom, though Nintendo denied the existence of the Sony deal as late as March 1991. At the Consumer Electronics Show in June 1991, Sony revealed a Super Famicom with a built-in CD-ROM drive, named the "Play Station" (also known as SNES-CD). However, a day after the announcement at CES, Nintendo announced that it would be breaking its partnership with Sony, opting to go with Philips instead but using the same technology. The deal was broken by Nintendo after they were unable to come to an agreement on how revenue would be split between the two companies. The breaking of the partnership infuriated Sony President Norio Ohga, who responded by appointing Kutaragi with the responsibility of developing the PlayStation project to rival Nintendo.

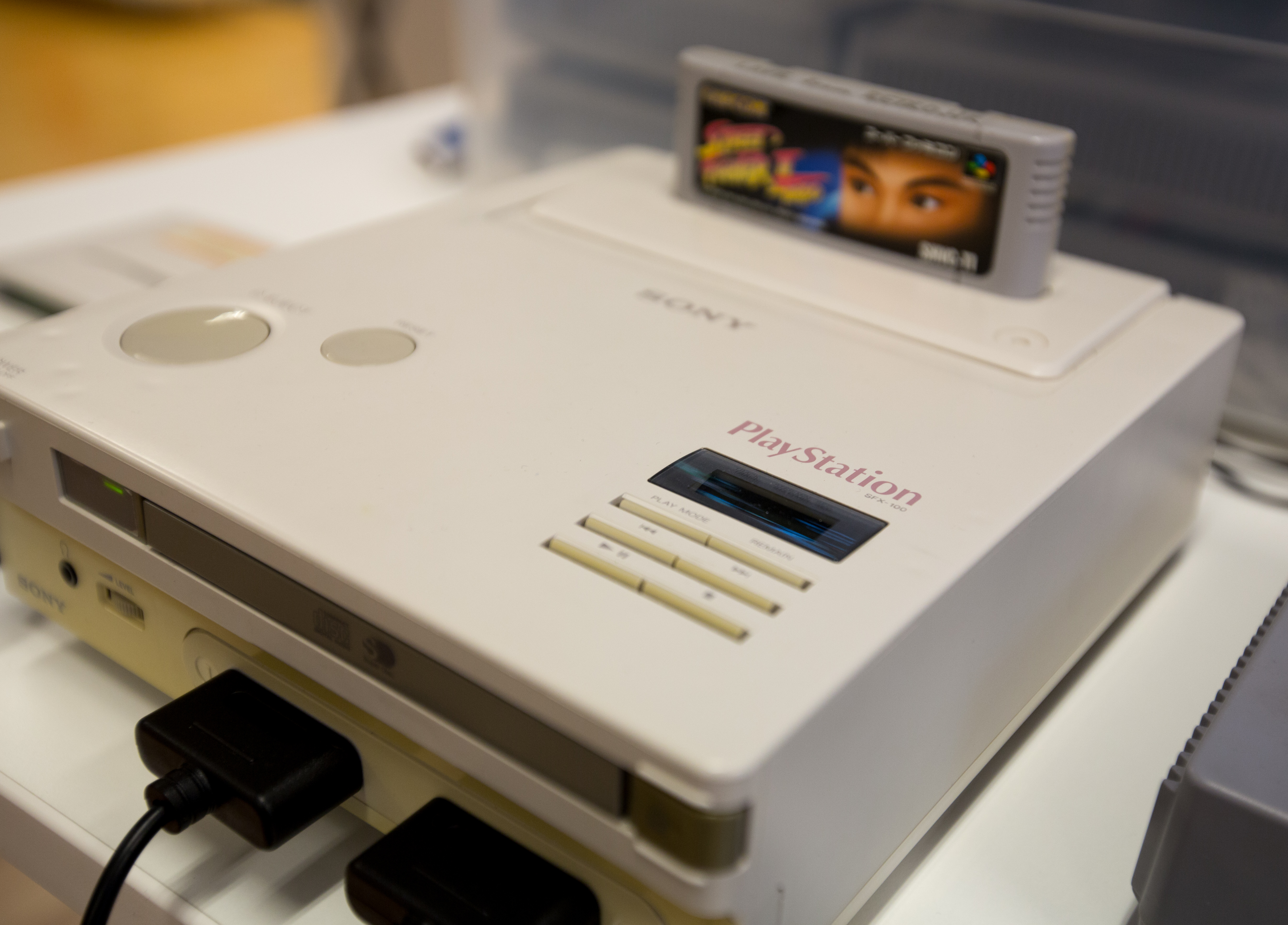
SNES-based PlayStation prototype

Negotiations continued between Nintendo and Sony, with Nintendo offering Sony a "non-gaming role" alongside its new partnership with Philips. Ken Kutaragi swiftly rejected the proposal amidst growing internal criticism at Sony regarding his push into the video game industry. Negotiations officially broke down in May 1992. To determine the project's future, Sony President Norio Ohga convened a high-level meeting in June 1992 with Kutaragi and senior board members. During the meeting, Kutaragi presented a proprietary CD-ROM system capable of rendering 3D graphics, convincing Ohga to greenlight the development of a standalone Sony console.

=== Home consoles ===
Launched in Japan in December 1994 and globally in 1995, the original first PlayStation revolutionized the video game industry by establishing 3D real-time graphics as the new standard and utilizing cheap, high-capacity CD-ROMs over traditional cartridges. The system captured 61% of global console sales during its lifetime. This market dominance effectively broke Nintendo's long-standing industry lead, making the system the first home console to surpass 100 million units shipped worldwide. Its success was driven by a vast software library featuring major hits, including exclusive franchises like Gran Turismo, Crash Bandicoot, Spyro the Dragon and Twisted Metal.

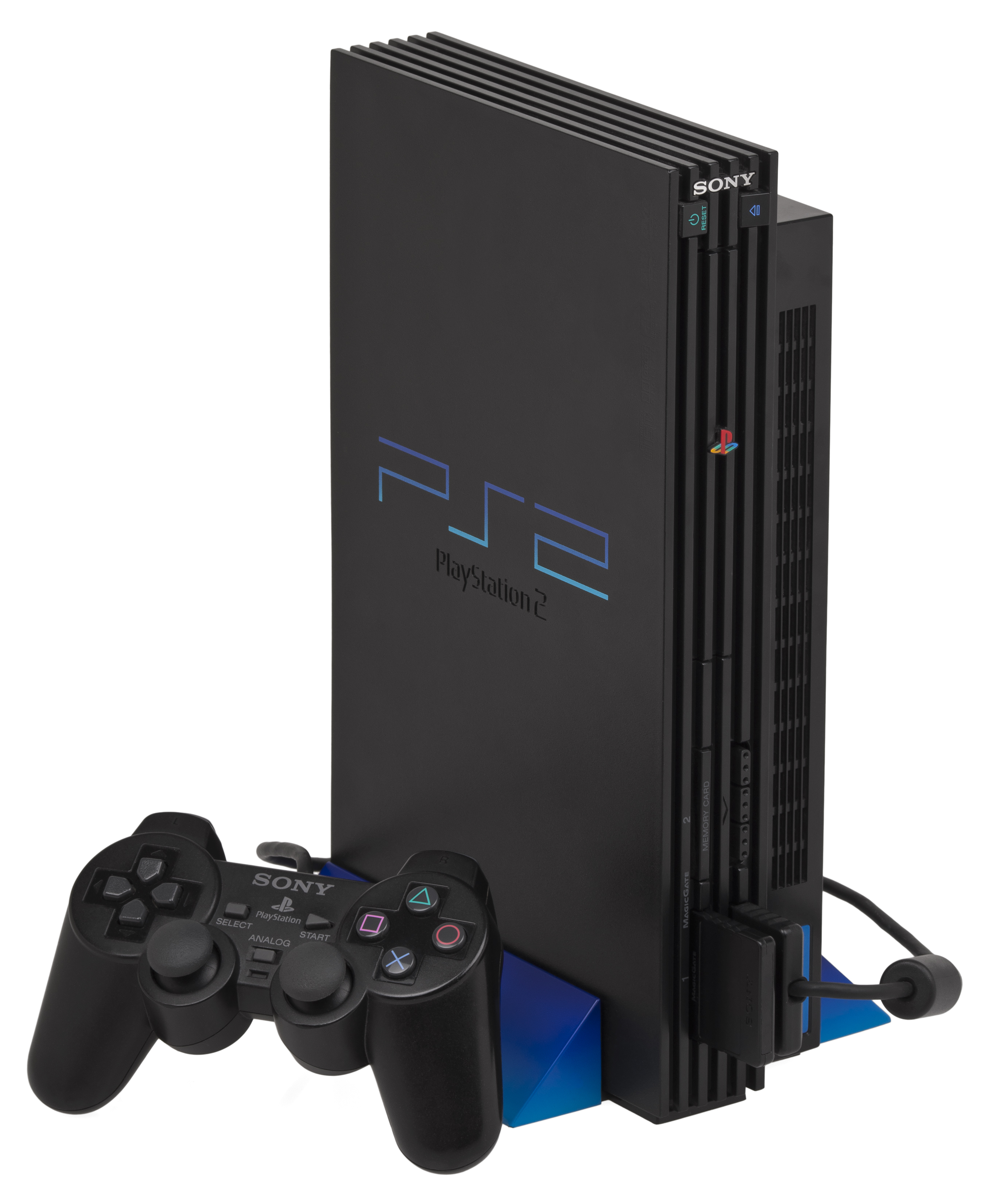
The PlayStation 2 (2000) is the best-selling video game console of all time.

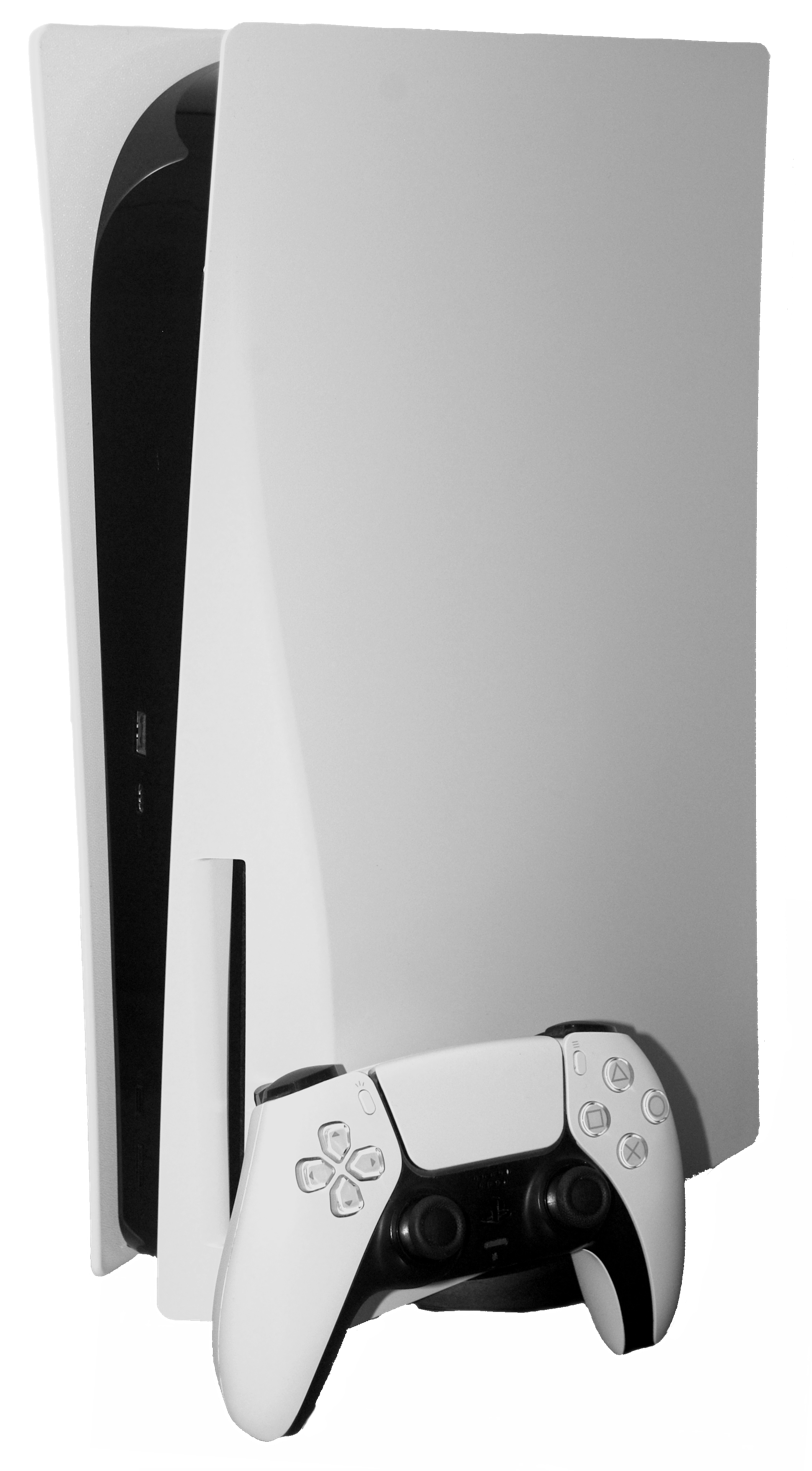
The PlayStation 5 (2020) is the current-generation video game console by Sony.

Sony released the PlayStation 2 in 2000, achieving even greater commercial success than its predecessor. The platform dominated the market through backward compatibility with original PlayStation titles, an unmatched software library and a built-in DVD player that served as an affordable home media center. The console has become the most successful of all time, surpassing 160 million units sold worldwide over its lifetime. Its market success was driven by major first-party releases such as Gran Turismo 3: A-Spec, God of War, Shadow of the Colossus, Jak and Daxter: The Precursor Legacy and Ratchet & Clank.

Sony released the PlayStation 3 in 2006, introducing high-definition capabilities and becoming the first home console to adopt the Blu-ray disc format. Its proprietary Cell Broadband Engine architecture provided immense processing power, but its high production cost resulted in a launching price point well above competitors like the Xbox 360 and Wii, forcing Sony to lose an estimated $240 to $300 on every console sold at launch. While these launch hurdles and a complex developer environment caused initial sales performance to lag behind rival platforms, structural hardware revisions allowed the system to recover. A strong library of exclusive franchises, including Uncharted, God of War and The Last of Us, helped the console eventually surpass the Xbox 360 with over 87 million units shipped. In 2010, the platform added motion controls with the release of the PlayStation Move controller.

PlayStation at the Electronic Entertainment Expo 2012 in Los Angeles

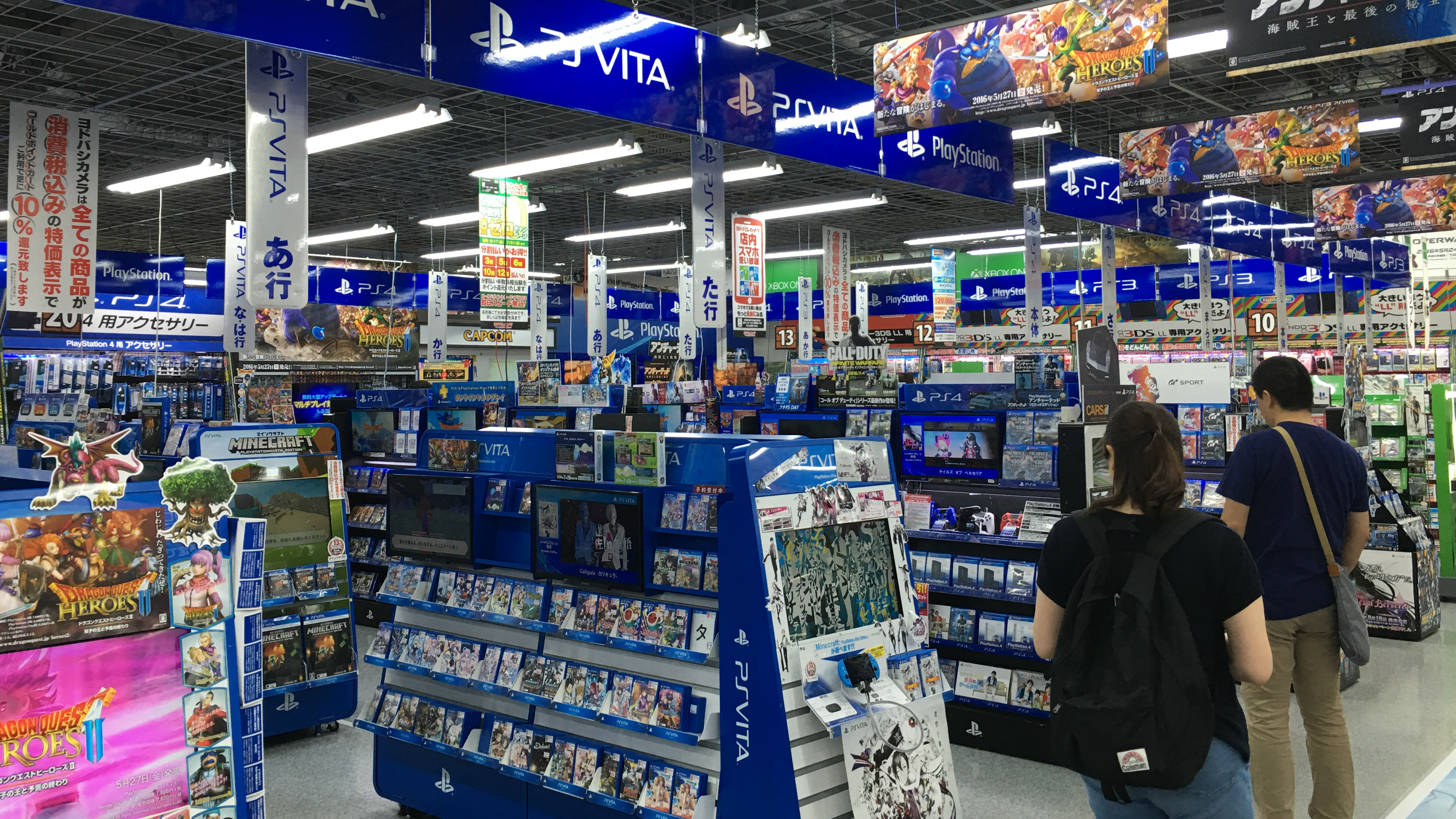
Physical PlayStation games in Japanese store (2016)

Sony launched its fourth home console, the PlayStation 4, in November 2013. Released alongside Microsoft's Xbox One, the console quickly won the generation's sales battle and established early market dominance. Over its lifecycle, Sony expanded the ecosystem with the PlayStation VR headset in 2016. By the end of its main production run, the PlayStation 4 became one of the best-selling home consoles in history, with global sales exceeding 117 million units. The platform's massive commercial success was driven by a strong library of critically acclaimed exclusives, including Marvel's Spider-Man, God of War, Horizon Zero Dawn, Uncharted 4: A Thief's End, Ghost of Tsushima and The Last of Us Part II.

As of 2020, Sony has sold over 500 million hardware units and over 5 billion games globally.

Sony released the PlayStation 5 in November 2020. Throughout its lifetime, the platform suffered from severe stock shortages. Supply chain disruptions during the COVID-19 pandemic caused a widespread chip shortage, while increased demand for AI data centers subsequently created a memory shortage that elevated the cost of components. These shortages limited store stock, drove widespread scalping, and eventually forced Sony to raise retail prices across key global markets. As of 2026, PlayStation 5 sold 95 million units. Sony expanded the hardware lineup with the PlayStation VR2 headset in 2023. The platform's popularity was driven by major exclusive games, including Demon's Souls, Ratchet & Clank: Rift Apart, God of War Ragnarök, Ghost of Yōtei, Marvel's Spider-Man 2 and Marvel's Wolverine.

=== Handheld consoles ===
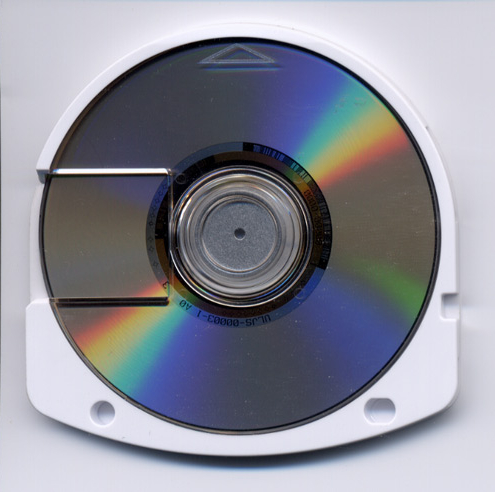
Universal Media Disc, developed by Sony for use on the PlayStation Portable

Sony entered the handheld gaming market in December 2004 with the PlayStation Portable (PSP). Positioned as a high-performance multimedia device capable of playing games, music, and video, the console achieved solid commercial success, eventually selling over 76 million units worldwide. Despite its strong performance and technical capabilities, it ultimately placed second in market share behind its primary competitor, the dual-screen Nintendo DS. Over the console's lifecycle, Sony introduced several hardware revisions, refining its physical design, weight, and display.

To power the system, Sony developed the Universal Media Disc (UMD), a proprietary small-format optical disc encased in a protective plastic shell. Beyond games, Sony heavily promoted UMD as a physical distribution medium for feature films and television series. Sluggish sales and high production costs led major Hollywood studios to drop support for movie releases on the format within a few years.

In 2009, the company launched the PSP Go, a compact slide-out model that completely eliminated the UMD drive in favor of internal flash storage, serving as an early experiment in digital-only distribution.

Sony formally succeeded the line in 2011 with the launch of the PlayStation Vita, its second-generation portable system featuring an OLED touchscreen, rear touchpad, and dual analog sticks. Despite its advanced technical features, the Vita faced strong competition from smartphones, resulting in a steep commercial drop to an estimated 15 to 16 million lifetime sales before it was discontinued.

=== PlayStation Studios ===
PlayStation Studios oversees the video game development at the studios owned by Sony Interactive Entertainment

Sony established PlayStation Studios to manage its global network of first-party game development teams, securing a steady stream of high-profile exclusive titles for its platforms.

In 2020, Sony began bringing flagship PlayStation 4 and PlayStation 5 single-player titles to PC players. After mixed commercial results, Sony decided in 2026 to stop porting these games and keep them console-exclusive.

As of 2026, its lineup includes Naughty Dog, Santa Monica Studio, Insomniac Games, Guerrilla Games, Sucker Punch Productions, Housemarque, Polyphony Digital, Team Asobi, Nixxes Software, Firesprite, Malaysia Studio, Media Molecule, Bend Studio, San Diego Studio, San Mateo Studio, Haven Studios, Bungie, teamLFG, Valkyrie Entertainment and XDev.

=== PlayStation Productions ===
PlayStation Productions logo

Sony launched PlayStation Productions in 2019 to adapt its video game franchises into feature films and television series. By working directly with Hollywood studios, the division ensures these screen adaptations maintain authentic creative control while introducing PlayStation stories to broader mainstream audiences.

The studio has built a lineup of live-action releases, including the television series The Last of Us on HBO and Twisted Metal on Peacock, alongside feature films such as Uncharted, Gran Turismo and Until Dawn.

== Film and television industry ==
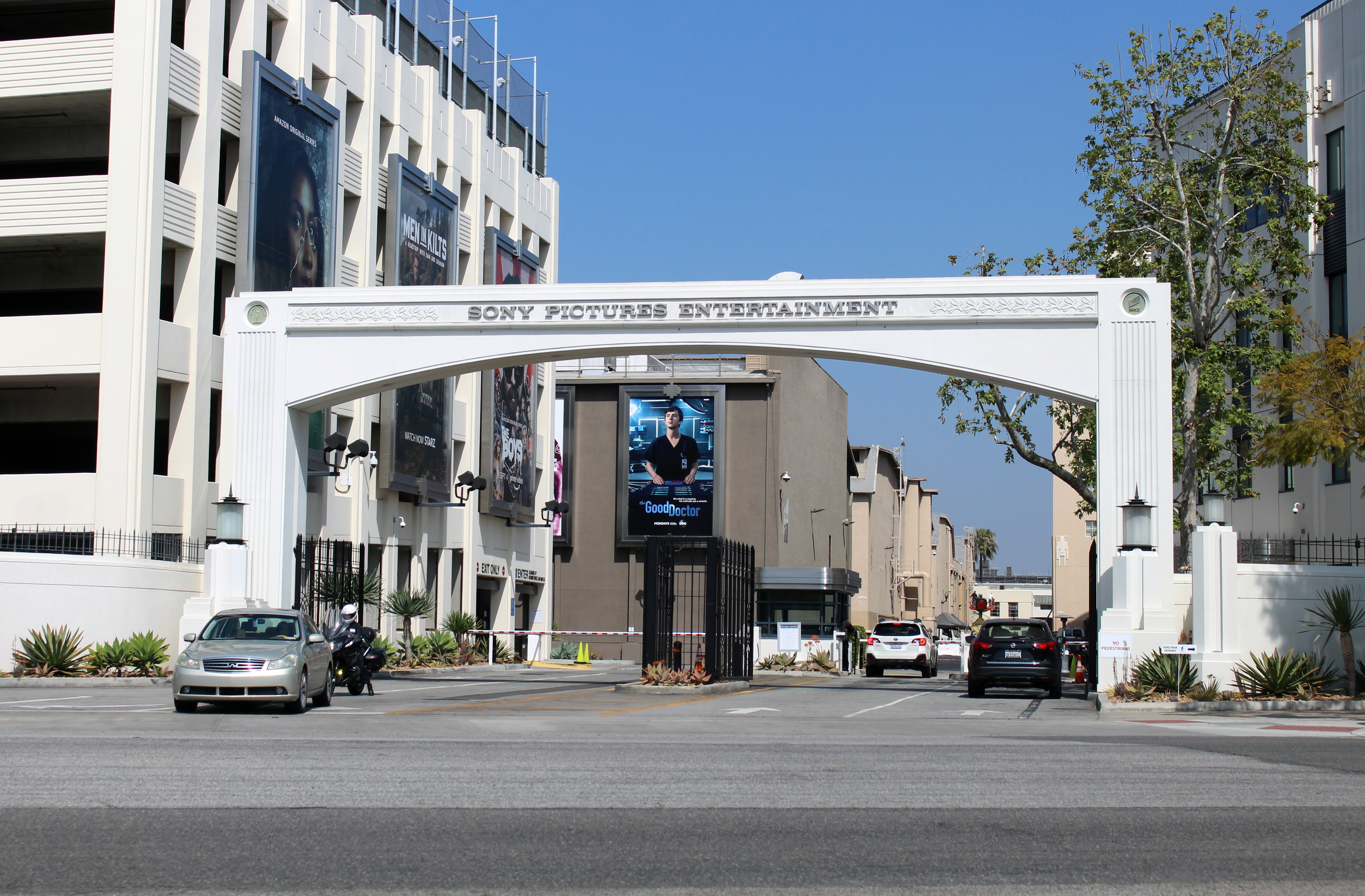
The entrance to the Sony Pictures Entertainment studio lot in Los Angeles, California

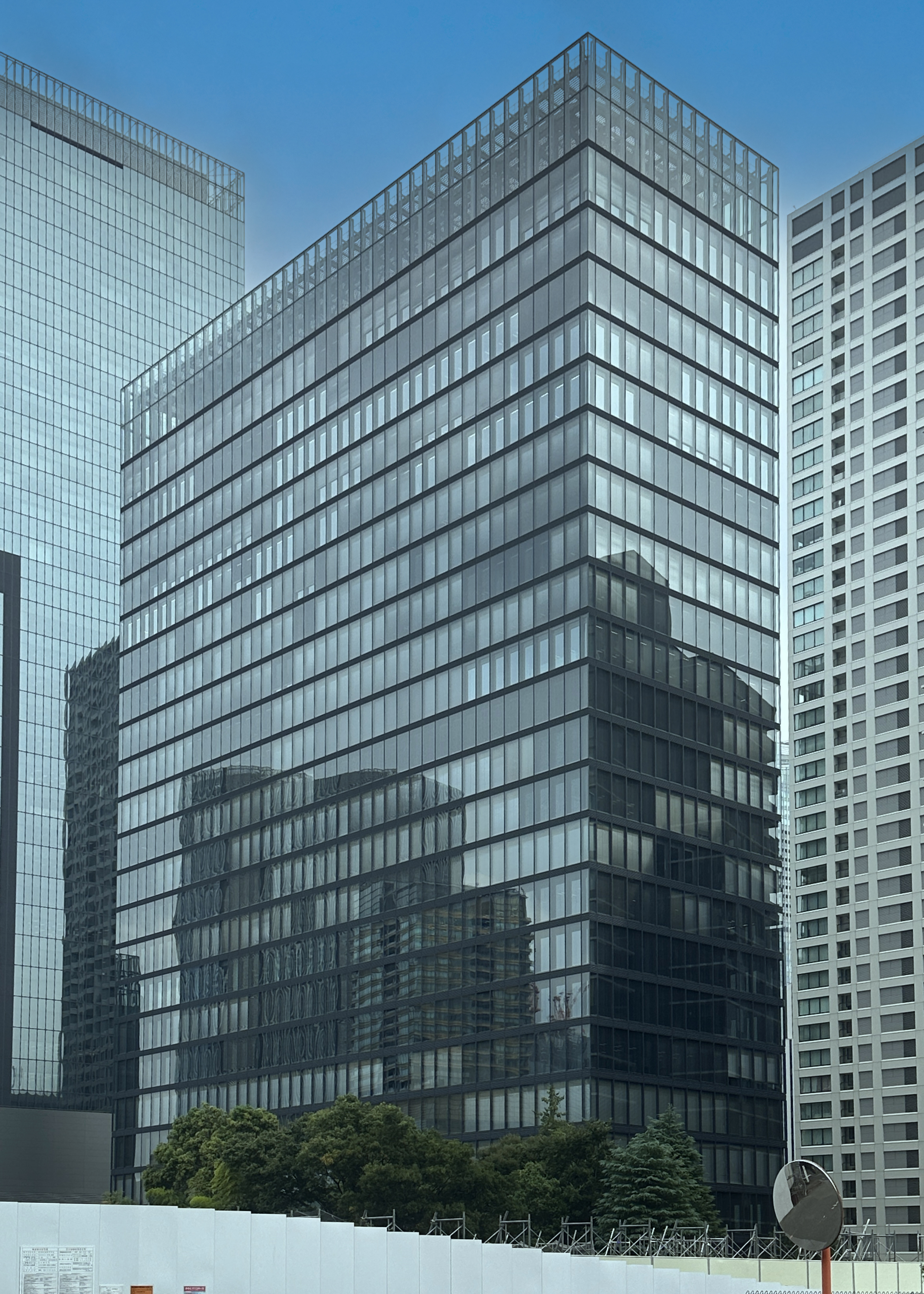
Sony Pictures Entertainment Japan headquarters in Minato, Tokyo

Sony Pictures Entertainment Inc. operates as the primary film and television production and distribution division of Sony. It is one of the major American film studios. The company entered the entertainment market in 1989 through the $3.4 billion acquisition of Columbia Pictures Entertainment.

Its principal film division, the Sony Pictures Motion Picture Group, encompasses several prominent production studios and labels, including Columbia Pictures, TriStar Pictures, Screen Gems, Sony Pictures Classics, 3000 Pictures, Affirm Films, Stage 6 Films, Destination Films, Sony Pictures International Productions and Ghost Corps. Global theatrical distribution across these banners is handled through Sony Pictures Releasing and Sony Pictures Releasing International, while physical and digital home media distribution is managed by Sony Pictures Home Entertainment.

Over its history, Sony Pictures Entertainment has produced major cinematic franchises, such as Spider-Man, Resident Evil, Bad Boys, Ghostbusters, Jumanji, The Karate Kid, Stuart Little and Men in Black. Historically, the studio achieved a 12.5% box office market share in 2011, ranking third among major Hollywood studios, following total group sales of $7.2 billion in 2010.

Columbia Pictures, the flagship unit of the Sony Pictures Motion Picture Group

Sony holds perpetual live-action and animated feature film rights to the Spider-Man character and hundreds of related Marvel Comics figures, acquired from Marvel Entertainment since 1999. Managed primarily under Columbia Pictures, the property forms the core of Sony Pictures Entertainment's primary film franchise assets, spanning standalone blockbuster series (Spider-Man), the animated Spider-Verse franchise (Spider-Man: Into the Spider-Verse) and Sony's Spider-Man Universe spin-offs (Venom). In 2015, Sony entered into a historic licensing and creative partnership with Marvel Studios, allowing Spider-Man to be integrated into the Marvel Cinematic Universe while Sony retains underlying ownership, financing, distribution rights and final creative control over standalone films.

In television, Sony Pictures Entertainment operates Sony Pictures Television, which produces and distributes global programming like Seinfeld, Breaking Bad, The Crown, The Boys and The Last of Us.

Sony Pictures Animation, the animation studio of Sony Pictures

The company's theatrical animated feature films are produced by Sony Pictures Animation. Founded in 2002, the studio creates original computer-animated projects, outside of traditional Japanese anime. The studio released its debut feature film Open Season in 2006. Since then, they produced critical and commercial hits including Cloudy with a Chance of Meatballs, Hotel Transylvania, Spider-Man: Across the Spider-Verse and KPop Demon Hunters.

Sony Pictures Imageworks, the visual effects studio of Sony Pictures

Visual effects are handled by Sony Pictures Imageworks. Based in Vancouver, the studio serves as the primary visual effects and digital animation vendor for both Sony Pictures Animation and third-party major film studios.

Sony Pictures Entertainment Japan serves as the Tokyo-based local film production and distribution division, overseeing theatrical distribution in Japan as well as local live-action and anime co-productions.

Sony Pictures Networks Productions operates as the Indian feature film production division of Sony Pictures Networks India, producing and acquiring Hindi and regional language theatrical films.

=== Television channels ===
AXN logo

Sony built a large global network of television channels through its Sony Pictures Television division and international business partners. The company started expanding its television business in the mid-1990s, beginning with the launch of Sony Entertainment Television in India in 1995. This channel became a major general entertainment network and later grew into a large subsidiary called Sony Pictures Networks, which manages many sports, movie and youth channels across Indian subcontinent.

In 1997, Sony launched AXN, an action and entertainment network that became widely popular across Asia, Europe and Latin America. Over the years, several localized variations of the channel also existed, including AXN Beyond, AXN Black, AXN White, AXN Crime, AXN Sci Fi, AXN Mystery, AXN Spin and AXN Movies.

In addition to its AXN network, Sony built a broad family of regional television brands tailored to local markets across Europe, Latin America, North America and Asia. The company launched core general entertainment networks such as Sony Channel in 1995 alongside film-focused networks like Sony Movies. Across these regions, Sony also operated a variety of targeted channels, including Cine Sony, Sony Crime Channel, Sony Sci-Fi, Sony Turbo and Sony Spin.

The company entered the anime television market by launching Animax in Japan in 1998, later expanding the network across Asia, Europe and the Americas.

=== Streaming ===
Sony Pictures Core, Sony's streaming service exclusively for Sony hardware, offering high-bitrate 4K movie streaming

To adapt to the global shift toward digital media, Sony expanded its television operations into streaming.

In 2011, the company established the Sony Entertainment Network as a unified umbrella platform to integrate its digital video, music and gaming services across devices. In January 2015, the Sony Entertainment Network was superseded by the PlayStation Network.

In 2013, the company launched SonyLIV, which became a major over-the-top streaming platform in India and Southeast Asia, offering regional television series, live sports coverage and digital original productions.

In 2015, Sony launched AXN Play in Latin America and AXN Now across European markets, a dedicated video-on-demand service designed as a digital extension of its linear AXN brand across Europe and Latin America, offering pay-TV subscribers on-demand access to the content.

Sony expanded into targeted subscription streaming by purchasing the faith and family focused service Pure Flix in November 2020. In 2023, Sony merged the platform with Great American Media to form a joint venture, combining the streaming service with cable channels like Great American Family. The service was subsequently rebranded as Great American Pure Flix.

Crunchyroll, the world's largest anime streaming service, offering an extensive library of anime series and movies

Sony established a dominant position in the global anime market through a series of strategic acquisitions, beginning with the purchase of Funimation in 2017, which subsequently absorbed platforms such as AnimeLab, Anime on Demand, Anime Digital Network and Wakanim and followed by the acquisition of Crunchyroll from AT&T in 2021 for $1.175 billion. Operating through a joint venture between Sony Pictures Entertainment and Aniplex, the company subsequently consolidated all of these services and their content catalogs under the Crunchyroll brand, creating the dominant global anime streaming platform.

In 2021, Sony introduced Bravia Core, an exclusive streaming service for its high-end televisions and Xperia smartphones. Using its proprietary Pure Stream technology, the service offers high-bitrate 4K HDR streaming up to 80 Mbps, delivering near-lossless, Ultra HD Blu-ray-equivalent picture quality alongside IMAX Enhanced films. In 2023, the platform was rebranded as Sony Pictures Core and expanded to PlayStation 4 and PlayStation 5 consoles.

=== Anime ===
Aniplex logo

Sony entered the anime market in 1995 when Sony Music Entertainment Japan established Aniplex to manage creative animation productions. In 2005, Aniplex founded A-1 Pictures as Sony's initial dedicated animation production studio. Through group-wide coordination and international acquisitions, Sony developed its anime operations into a major core segment reported as the "fourth pillar of its entertainment portfolio".

The company's anime assets remain distributed primarily across its music and pictures divisions, with Sony Music Entertainment Japan overseeing Aniplex, while global anime streaming distribution is centralized under Crunchyroll, LLC, a joint venture co-owned by Aniplex and Sony Pictures.

Sony operates its dedicated anime production studios directly through Aniplex. A-1 Pictures specializes in traditional 2D animated television series, feature films and original video animations. CloverWorks was spun off from A-1 Pictures in 2018 to function as an independent studio focused on high-profile anime series and theatrical releases. Boundary operates as a specialized 3D studio, producing computer-generated animation and digital effects for anime projects. Hayate Inc. operates as an anime production joint venture established in 2025 by Aniplex and Crunchyroll to plan, develop and produce original anime content specifically for global distribution on Crunchyroll.

== Music industry ==
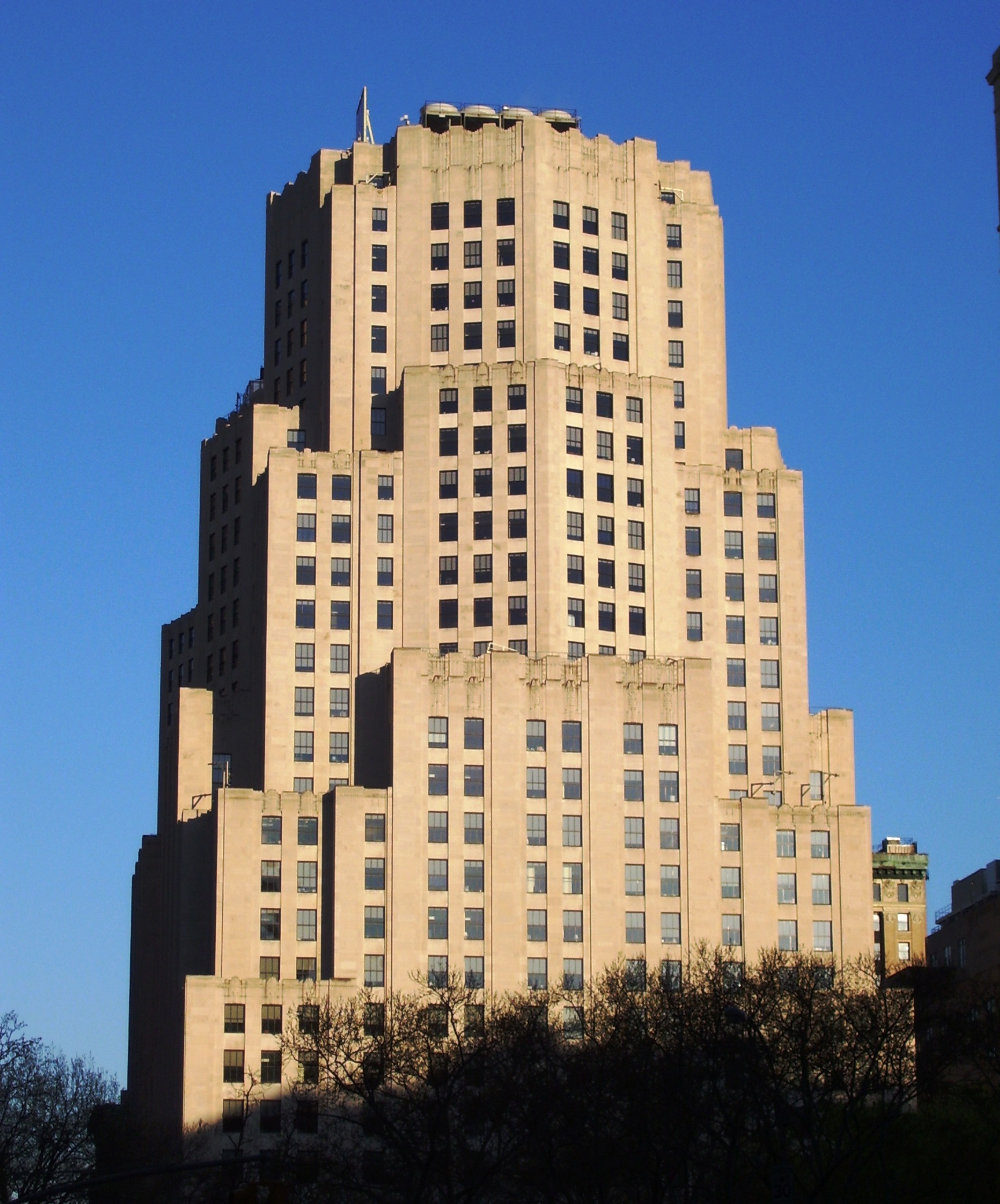
Sony Music Entertainment headquarters in New York City

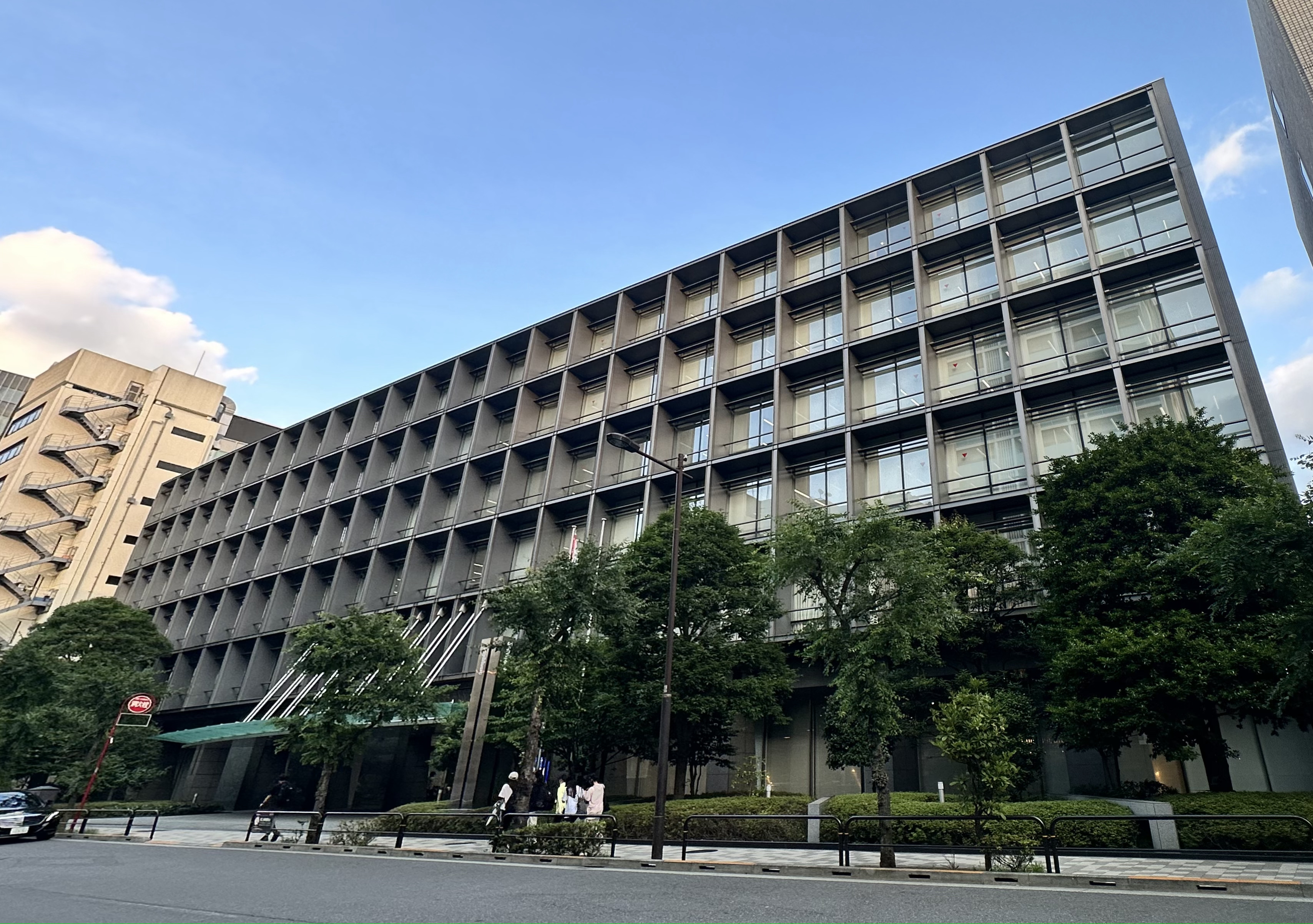
Sony Music Entertainment Japan and Aniplex headquarters in Chiyoda, Tokyo

Sony Music Group (SMG) is an American multinational music conglomerate operating as a subsidiary of Sony Group Corporation through Sony Corporation of America. Serving as the parent corporate umbrella to unite Sony's global recorded music and music publishing operations under unified leadership, SMG houses both Sony Music Entertainment (SME) and Sony Music Publishing (SMP). Positioned alongside Universal Music Group and Warner Music Group, it functions as the second-largest global music enterprise among the "big three" record companies.

=== Record labels ===
A core cornerstone of this division is its group of four frontline flagship labels. Columbia Records serves as the primary flagship, specializing in mainstream pop, rock, and urban releases as the oldest surviving brand name in recorded music. RCA Records specializes in global pop, contemporary R&B, hip-hop, and mainstream crossover acts. Epic Records operates as a frontline hub specializing in hip-hop, R&B, pop, and modern rock. Arista Records functions as a primary flagship label specializing in pop, dance, electronic, and urban music.

Sony Music Entertainment operates as a multi-label network

The origin of Sony's music business traces back to 1968, when Sony and American publisher CBS Records launched a 50:50 joint venture in Japan called CBS/Sony Records. In March 1988, this venture merged with several related subsidiaries to form Sony Music Entertainment Japan (SMEJ), which continues to operate independently under direct Japanese parent ownership.

In 1988, Sony acquired the CBS Record Group for $2 billion, establishing the foundation for launching Sony Music Entertainment in 1991. The acquisition integrated historic flagship and frontline record labels into Sony's umbrella, including Columbia Records and Epic Records.

To consolidate global market share and navigate the physical-to-digital music transition, Sony executed a major corporate merger in August 2004 by combining its recording operations with Bertelsmann Music Group (BMG) to form a 50:50 joint venture named Sony BMG Music Entertainment. The merger brought together legendary imprints from both conglomerates, uniting Sony's Columbia and Epic labels with BMG's RCA, Arista, Jive and LaFace records. During this era, Sony BMG controlled roughly a quarter of the global music market.

Columbia Records, Epic Records, RCA Records, and Arista Records are Sony Music's four flagship record labels

The joint venture came to an end in October 2008 when Sony acquired Bertelsmann's remaining 50% stake for $1.2 billion, gaining full ownership of the joint catalog and reverting the enterprise name back to Sony Music Entertainment. Following the buyout, former BMG imprints like RCA, Arista, and Jive were fully integrated into Sony's corporate hierarchy. During this period of portfolio realignment, Sony acquired digital recognition provider Gracenote for $260 million in 2008 before divesting it to Tribune Media Company for $170 million in 2014. To support independent artists and self-releasing creators, Sony built out distribution and artist services platforms by acquiring global distributor The Orchard for $200 million in 2015 and artist-services platform AWAL for $430 million in 2021.

Over time, the company expanded its roster with genre-specific and regional labels such as Sony Music Nashville, Provident Label Group, Sony Masterworks (including Sony Classical and Milan Records), Ministry of Sound, Sony Music Latin, and Som Livre.

=== Music publishing ===
Sony Music Publishing logo

Parallel to its recording labels, Sony built the world's largest music publishing operation. Sony originally established its standalone music publishing arm, Sony Music Publishing, in 1991 following its acquisition of CBS Records.

In 1995, Sony merged its publishing division with Michael Jackson's ATV Music Publishing to create the 50:50 joint venture Sony/ATV Music Publishing, in a transaction that valued the combined enterprise at approximately $500 million. To expand its publishing catalog, Sony/ATV acquired publisher Famous Music from Viacom for $370 million in 2007, absorbing catalogs with rights to works by artists such as Eminem and Akon. It subsequently led an investor consortium to acquire EMI Music Publishing in 2012, taking operational administration of the catalog alongside a minority equity stake.

In 2016, Sony bought out Michael Jackson’s estate stake in Sony/ATV for $750 million to gain 100% ownership, and later completed a full buyout of EMI Music Publishing for $2.3 billion in 2018.

In 2021, the combined publishing enterprise was formally rebranded back to Sony Music Publishing. The roster controls rights to over 4 million compositions, including works by The Beatles, Bob Dylan, Taylor Swift, Sam Smith, Lady Gaga, and Ed Sheeran.

== Financial services ==
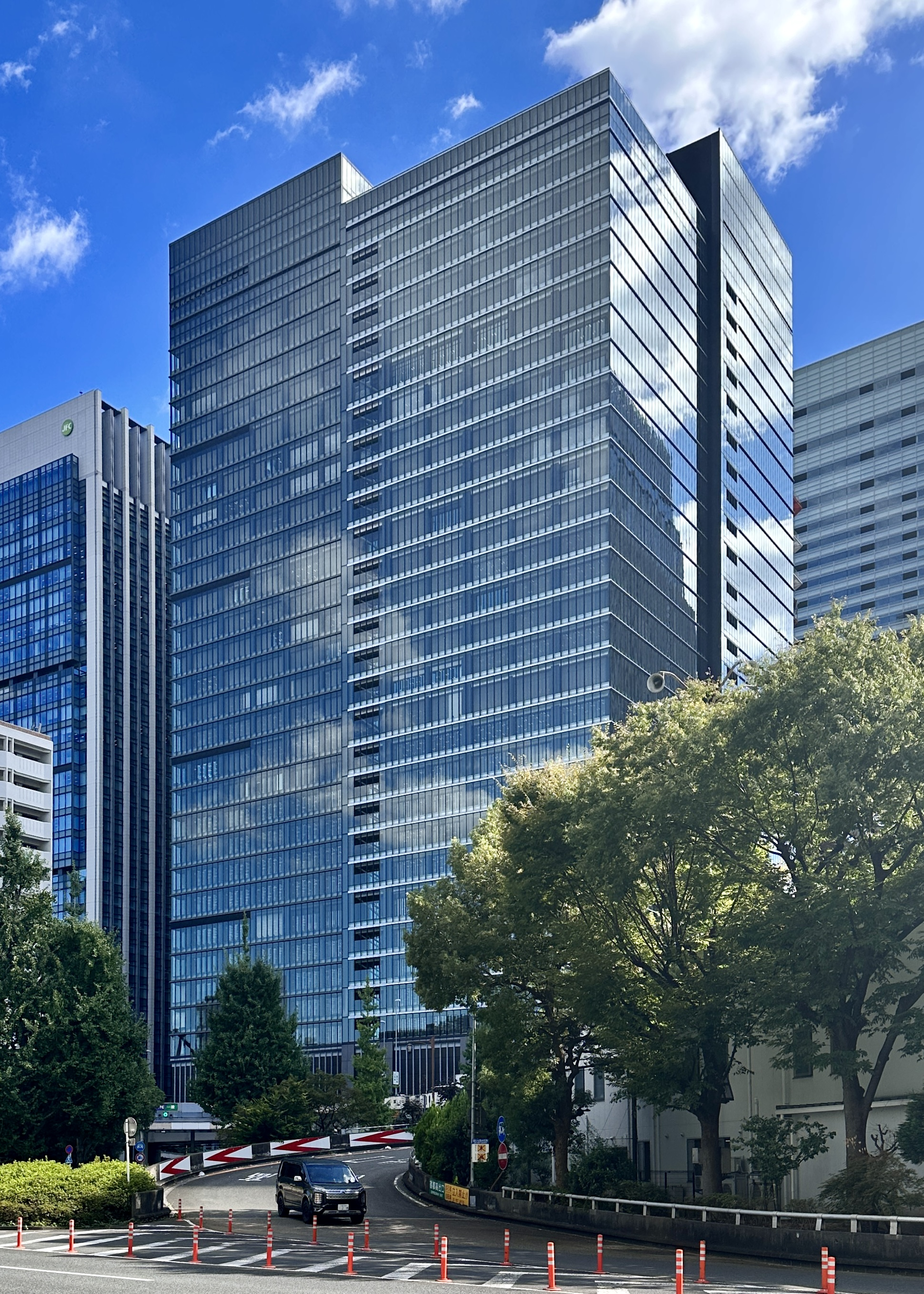
Headquarters of Sony Financial Group in Otemachi, Tokyo, Japan

Sony Financial Group is a holding company for Sony's financial services business which includes Sony Life (in Japan and the Philippines), Sony Assurance, Sony Bank, etc. The unit proved to be the most profitable of Sony's businesses in FY 2005, earning $1.7 billion in profit. Sony Financial's low fees have aided the unit's popularity while threatening Sony's premium brand name.

In October 2025, Sony completed the partial spin-off of Sony Financial Group Inc. (SFGI). The transaction was executed via a dividend in kind, with Sony keeping 16.4% of the new listed company

== Corporate affairs ==
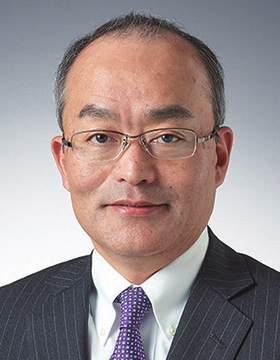
Hiroki Totoki, Sony's President and CEO

=== Management ===
==== Corporate Governance and Organizational Structure ====
Sony Group operates under a corporate governance structure that separates the oversight functions of the Board of Directors from the execution of business operations by the management team. Sony operates as a "Company with Three Committees" under Japan's Companies Act, with separate Nominating, Audit and Compensation Committees. The Board determines fundamental management policies and other material matters, while delegating substantial decision-making authority for business operations to the CEO and other Senior Executives.

The Group's management structure combines centralized corporate oversight with substantial autonomy at the business level. The President and CEO, who is responsible for the overall management of Sony Group, delegates authority to senior executives according to their respective responsibilities. Major businesses are led by Business CEOs, who are responsible for the management and performance of their respective businesses while operating within the strategic direction and authority established at the Group level. This structure allows individual businesses to make operational decisions relatively independently while remaining accountable to the Group's overall management and strategy.

==== Board of Directors ====
Members of the Board
Name	Position/Role
Wendy Becker	Chair of the Board, Chair of Nominating Committee
Hiroki Totoki	Director
Lin Tao	Director
Joseph A. Kraft Jr.	Outside Director, Chair of Audit Committee
Neil Hunt	Outside Director
William Morrow	Outside Director, Chair of Compensation Committee
Shingo Konomoto	Outside Director
Yoriko Goto	Outside Director
Nora Denzel	Outside Director
Masayuki Hyodo	Outside Director

==== Executive Management ====
Sony's executive management consists of senior executives responsible for Group-wide strategy, financial management, digital transformation, human resources and other corporate functions.

Corporate Executive Officers
Name	Position
Kenichiro Yoshida	Executive Chairman
Hiroki Totoki	Chief Executive Officer
Lin Tao	Chief Financial Officer
Toshimoto Mitomo	Chief Strategy Officer
Tsuyoshi Kodera	Chief Digital Officer
Yasuhiro Ito	Chief People Officer

==== Business Chiefs ====
Major Sony businesses are overseen by executives designated as Business CEOs or officers in charge of the respective businesses. These executives are responsible for the performance and day-to-day management of their businesses while operating within the Group's overall strategic and governance framework.

Sony Group's structure.

Segment CEOs
Name	Position
Hideaki Nishino	Officer in charge of Game & Network Services Business CEO of Sony Interactive Entertainment
Rob Stringer	Officer in charge of Music Business (Global) Chairman of Sony Music Group, CEO of Sony Music Entertainment
Atsuhiro Iwakami	Officer in charge of Music Business (Japan) CEO of Sony Music Entertainment Japan
Ravi Ahuja	Officer in charge of Pictures Business CEO of Sony Pictures Entertainment
Shinji Sashida	Officer in charge of Imaging & Sensing Solutions Business CEO of Sony Semiconductor Solutions
Kenji Tanaka	Officer in charge of Entertainment, Technology & Services Business CEO of Sony Corporation

=== Financial Information ===
The key trends for Sony are (in billions of ¥, except Sales and Assets in trillions of ¥)::

	Sales	Net Income	Net Margin	Assets
FY12	6.5	-457	-7.0%	13.3
FY13	6.8	43.0	0.6%	14.2
FY14	7.8	-128	-1.6%	15.3
FY15	8.2	-126	-1.5%	15.8
FY16	8.1	148	1.8%	16.6
FY17	7.6	73.2	1.0%	17.6
FY18	8.5	491	5.8%	19.0
FY19	8.7	916	10.5%	20.9
FY20	8.3	582	7.0%	23.0
FY21	9.0	1,172	13.0%	26.3
FY22	9.9	882	8.9%	30.4
FY23	11.5	937	8.1%	32.0
FY24	12.0	1,067	8.9%	35.3
FY25	12.4	1,0	8,46%	15.6

Sony's results by different divisons in billions of yen (FY25)
Segment	Sales	Operating Income	Operating Margin
Game & network services	4,685	463	9.9%
Music	2,120	446	21%
Pictures	1,499	104	7%
Entertainment, technology, & services	2,260	158	7%
Imaging & sensing solutions	2,151	357	16.6%
All other	89	−74.6	-83.8%
Total	12,479	1,447	11.6%

=== Community engagement ===
- EYE SEE project
  Sony Corporation is actively involved in the EYE SEE project conducted by UNICEF. EYE SEE digital photography workshops have been run for children in Argentina, Tunisia, Mali, South Africa, Ethiopia, Madagascar, Rwanda, Liberia and Pakistan.
- South Africa Mobile Library Project
  Sony assists The South Africa Primary Education Support Initiative (SAPESI) through financial donations and children book donations to the South Africa Mobile Library Project.
- The Sony Canada Charitable Foundation
  The Sony Canada Charitable Foundation (SCCF) is a non-profit organization which supports three key charities; the Make-A-Wish Canada, the United Way of Canada and the EarthDay and ECOKIDS program.
- Sony Foundation and You Can
  After the 2011 Queensland floods and Victorian bushfires, Sony Music released benefit albums with money raised going to the Sony Foundation. You Can is the youth cancer program of Sony Foundation.
- Open Planet Ideas Crowdsourcing Project
  Sony launched its Open Planet Ideas Crowdsourcing Project, in partnership with the World Wildlife Fund and the design group, IDEO.
- Street Football Stadium Project
  On the occasion of the 2014 World Cup in Brazil, Sony partnered with streetfootballworld and launched the Street Football Stadium Project to support football-based educational programmes in local communities across Latin America and Brazil. More than 25 Street Stadiums were developed since the project's inception.
- The Sony Global Relief Fund for COVID-19
  During the COVID-19 pandemic, Sony launched a relief fund in line with other media and tech companies to aid individuals working in the medical, education, and entertainment sectors.

== Criticism & controversies ==
Sony Group Corporation and its corporate divisions have been subjected to significant public backlash, multi-national regulatory scrutiny and legal proceedings related to their business practices, technological choices and corporate policies.

== See also ==
- List of acquisitions by Sony
- List of assets owned by Sony
- List of companies of Japan
- List of libraries owned by Sony
