= Sony Television =

Sony Television, Sony TV, or Sony HD may refer to any of the following television-related products from Japanese conglomerate Sony:

- Television sets designed and manufactured by Sony Corporation in Japan
  - Trinitron, television hardware brand (1968–2008)
  - Bravia (brand), television hardware brand (2005–present)
  - Sony WEGA, television hardware brand (1975–2005)
  - Sony Watchman, pocket television line (1982–2000)
- Television offerings from Sony Pictures in the United States
  - Sony Pictures Television, American television studio
    - Sony Pictures Television Networks, operator of Sony-branded television channels
      - Sony Channel, a brand of general entertainment television channels
      - Canal Sony, Latin American television channel
      - Sony Pictures Networks India, Indian television broadcaster
        - Sony Entertainment Television, Indian television channel
