= FD Trinitron/WEGA =

Flat version of the Trinitron picture tube

FD Trinitron WEGA
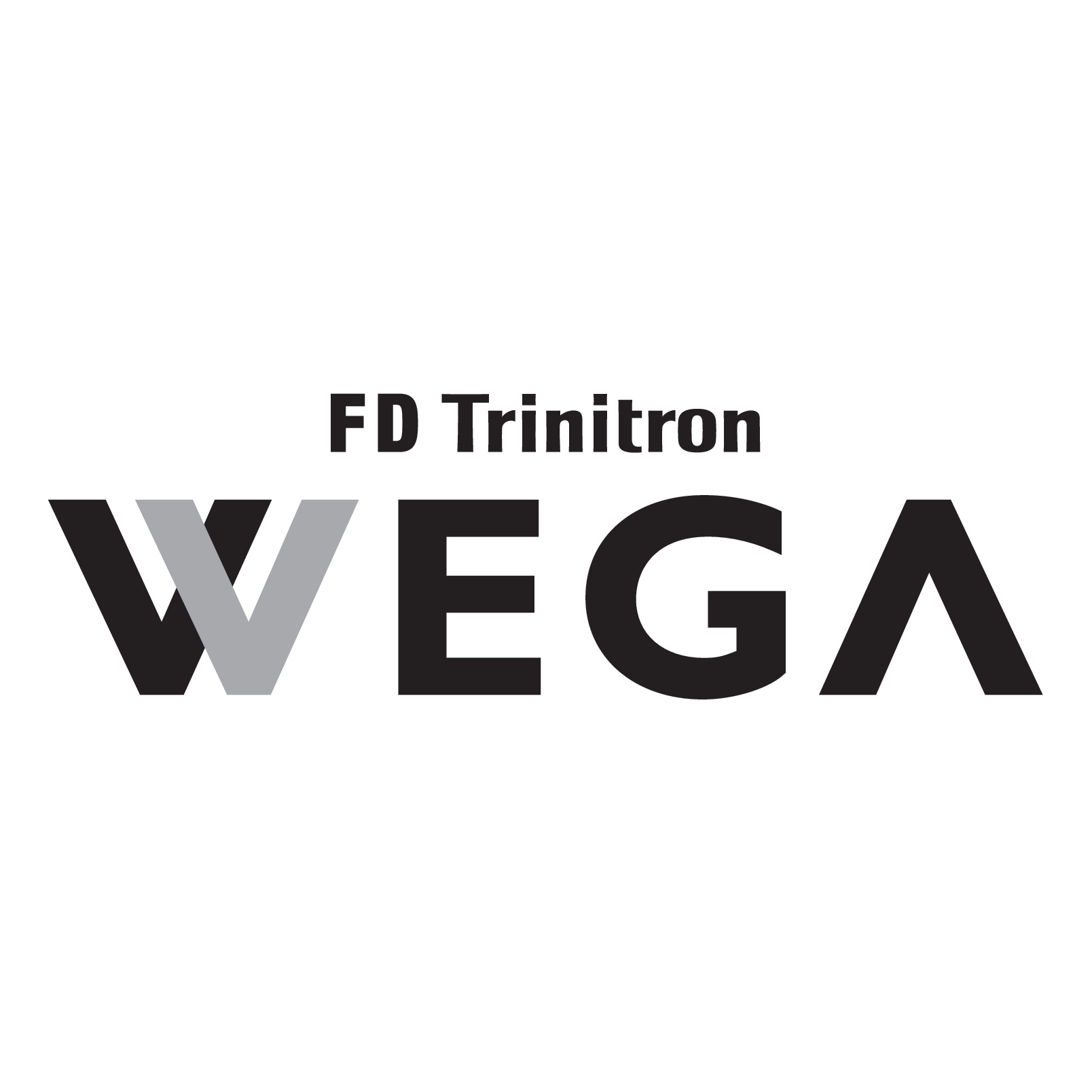
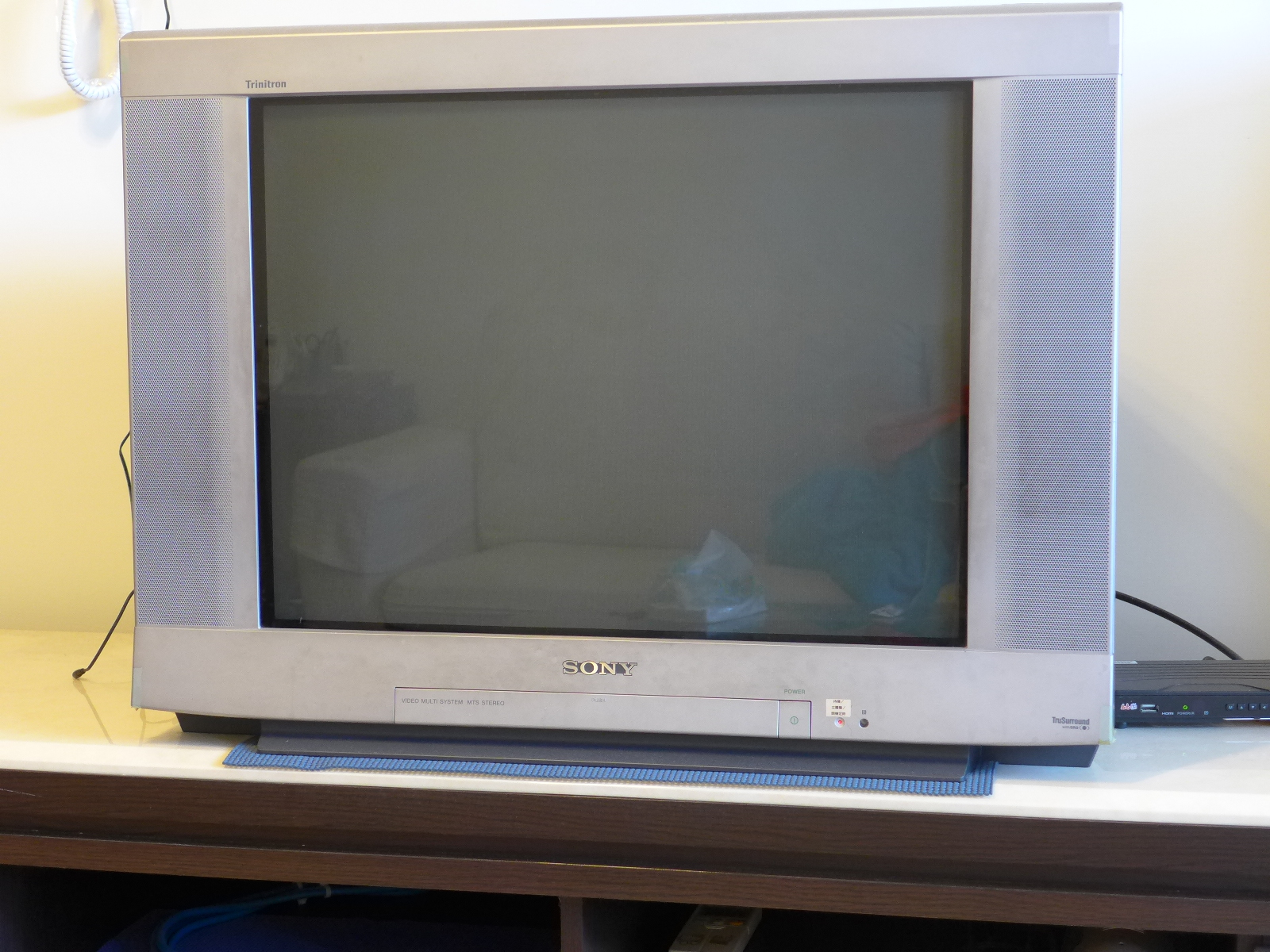
- KV-XA29 series FD Trinitron, circa 2001
- Owner: Sony Corporation
- Type: CRT displays (TVs and monitors)
- Retail availability: 1997–2008
- Predecessor: Trinitron
- Successor: Sony Bravia
- Production: Japan: Tokyo; United States: San Diego, California (Sony Technology Center); Westmoreland County, Pennsylvania (Sony Technology Center-Pittsburgh); Singapore

FD Trinitron (i.e. Flat Display Trinitron) is a television display technology created and marketed by Sony as the flat version of their Trinitron picture tube. These displays rid of the curvature of traditional cathode ray tube (CRT) by utilizing a fully flat glass front and matching flat aperture grille inside the tube, significantly improving the viewing quality. This technology was also used in Trinitron computer monitors.

Introduced in 1997, Sony released television sets using the FD Trinitron technology as the WEGA series in the Americas and Japan while in most other regions the WEGA name was used only for premium models. All Sony CRTs had shifted to flat by 2002, after which the WEGA brand was also used for unrelated flat-panel televisions. Production of all Trinitron tubes ceased in 2008.

== History ==
For more than half a century since the first commercial home cathode ray tube (CRT) television set made by Telefunken, the tubes had a bubble-like curve as a fundamental part of its design. Sony's own Trinitron had a unique cylindrical aperture grille that made it vertically flat but horizontally was still curved. In the 1980s, industry players looked for ways to flatten the curves and sharpen the corners for the purpose of reducing glare and distortion-free usage. Toshiba introduced the Flat Square Tube technology in 1983 that squared off round corners and significantly flattened the face. The first perfectly flat CRT display was released in 1987 by Zenith Electronics, based on technology invented and patented by them called Flat Tension Mask, structurally superior to all previous CRTs. It molded a fine alloy mask into the monitor glass under tension. However, very high manufacturing costs meant that this was solely a high-end computer monitor rather than larger sized TV sets and Zenith itself almost collapsed. Panasonic introduced significantly flatter TVs and with distinguished phosphors in Japan in 1990 and a year later in North America under the names GAOO and SuperFlat Prism. Sony responded in 1991 with the Super Trinitron.

On November 13, 1996, Sony announced the Super Flat Trinitron (KV-28SF5), the first fully mathematically flat CRT TV, released as a pioneering proof of concept. They then developed it further with vast improvements, including a computer-controlled feedback system and upscaling technology into what then became known as FD Trinitron, with the preceding letters standing for Flat and Display. Sony officially released the new FD Trinitron television sets as a mass-produced series, marketed under the WEGA brand, in Japan starting from June 5, 1997. All of these were 16:9 ratio widescreens and the most expensive flagship model released was high definition (MUSE). Not long after, 4:3 ratio models were also introduced.

The Sony WEGA with its FD Trinitron panels were announced for global release and distribution in January 1998. Initially introduced as 32 and 36 inch models, the new tubes were offered in a variety of resolutions for different uses. The basic WEGA models supported normal 480i signals, but a larger version offered 16:9 aspect ratios. The technology was quickly applied to the entire Trinitron range, from 13 to 40 inch along with high resolution versions; Hi-Scan and Super Fine Pitch. With the introduction of the WEGA series, Sony also introduced a new industrial style, leaving the charcoal-colored sets introduced in the 1980s for a new silver styling.

== Features ==
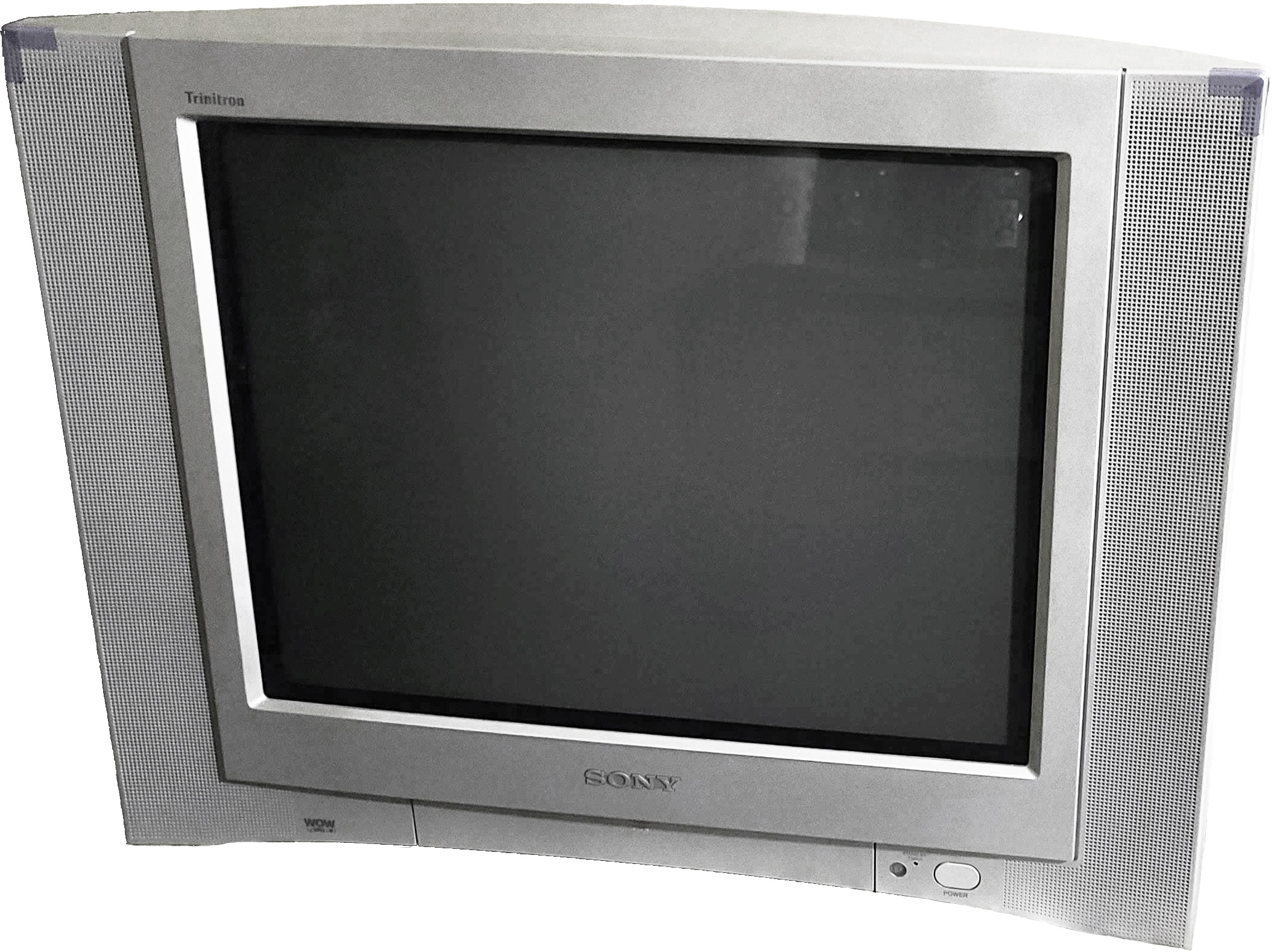
Sony FD Trinitron KV-20FV300, using the BA-6 chassis, which integrated the jungle board components and comb filter circuitry into a single integrated circuit which was named "One-Chip". The power supply, audio, and horizontal deflection circuits were also improved.

The FD Trinitron used computer-controlled feedback systems to ensure sharp focus across a flat screen. The FD Trinitron reduces the amount of glare on the screen by reflecting much less ambient light than spherical or vertically flat CRTs. Flat screens also increase total image viewing angle and have less geometric distortion in comparison to curved screens. The FD Trinitron line featured key standard improvements over prior Trinitron designs including a finer pitch aperture grille, an electron gun with a greater focal length for corner focus, and an improved deflection yoke for color convergence.

A key feature on some models was Digital Reality Creation (DRC), a proprietary digital upscaler that would turn a standard definition signal into a near high definition one (1050 vertical lines by 1440 horizontal lines). Newer versions of DRC were released over time. From 2002, some Trinitron models came with a newer system called WEGA Engine.

Initially FD Trinitron sets were noticeably heavier than other TVs of the same size because of extra glass added in the cabinet to support the tube.

== FD Trinitron variants ==
FD Trinitron CRTs were available in several screen aspect ratios. 4:3 and 16:9 were used on the WEGA line of televisions. Many 4:3 monitors were produced as well as several models using an aspect ratio of 16:10 (such as the GDM-W900 and GDM-FW900). Competitors included Mitsubishi with their Diamondtron NF brand of flat aperture grille CRT displays, as used in certain computer monitors from Mitsubishi, NEC, and Apple. There were four primary variants of the FD Trinitron as used in televisions.

Trade name	Physical resolution (aperture grille)
WEGA	480i
WEGA 16:9 Enhanced	480i
Hi-Scan	853×1080i
Super Fine Pitch	1440×1080i

16:9 Enhanced WEGA models differ from original WEGA models mainly in their ability to display anamorphic video content in its proper screen aspect ratio.

Super Fine Pitch refers to Sony's line of Trinitrons with high horizontal resolution and very fine aperture grille stripe pitch. By the end of CRT's market dominance, only Sony and JVC had released such high-resolution CRT HDTVs to the non-professional consumer market. Hi-Scan is Sony's trademark for all Trinitron displays capable of processing a 1080i signal. Super Fine Pitch tubes naturally fall into this category, as do some Sony Trinitron SDTVs that cannot physically resolve 1080 lines of vertical resolution, but the term Hi-Scan is commonly used to refer to Sony Trinitron HDTVs that do not feature an SFP tube.

== Sales and reception ==
Sony marketed the product at launch as a revolutionary TV product. It achieved high initial sales in Japan and a good reception elsewhere. Before the FD Trinitron, manufacturers were unable to create a sufficiently strong design for supporting a flat screen on a large tube. By 1999 and 2000, numerous other manufacturers had introduced flatscreen CRTs such as the Panasonic Tau series, LG Flatron (using the Zenith-made acquired patent), Toshiba AF/Cinema and Philips RealFlat. Manufacturing costs quickly dropped and flat-surface CRTs had largely replaced curved displays some time later across the industry, holding on only in the small-screen ultra budget space.

Sony would go on to receive an Emmy Award from the National Academy of Television Arts and Sciences in 2001 for its development of flat screen CRT technology.

In 2001, the FD Trinitron WEGA series had become the top selling television model in the United States. By 2003, over 40 million sets had been sold worldwide.

As the television market shifted towards LCD technology, the impact of which was quickly felt by Sony after the introduction of Sharp Aquos, Sony eventually ended production of the Trinitron in Japan in 2004, and in the US in 2006. Sony would continue to sell the Trinitron in China, India, and regions of South America using tubes delivered from their Singapore plant. Worldwide production ended when Singapore and Malaysia ceased production in end of March 2008. The FD Trinitron series is one of the most sought after televisions among hobbyists of retrogaming.

== List of Sony FD Trinitron/WEGA television models released in the United States ==
Listed in descending order according to size, release date, and product line.

Technology	Model	Image size		16:9 enhancement	Tuner	Inputs					Speaker output	Power consumption	Weight (lb)	Size (W, H, D) (in)	Comment
Technology	Model	16:9	4:3	16:9 enhancement	Tuner	DV	S-Video	Composite (RCA)	Component (Y, Pb, Pr)	RF	Speaker output	Power consumption	Weight (lb)	Size (W, H, D) (in)	Comment
Super Fine Pitch (4:3 screen)	KD-36XS955	33"	36"	Native	ATSC	HDMI	3	4	2	1	7.5W+15W subwoofer	270W	238.5	39×30×25	User Manual
Super Fine Pitch (16:9 screen)	KD-34XBR960N	34"	28"	Native	ATSC	HDMI	3	4	2	1	7.5W+15W subwoofer	270W	196	39×25×23	Removes anti-glare screen coating from standard KD-34XBR960
Super Fine Pitch (16:9 screen)	KD-34XBR960	34"	28"	Native	ATSC	HDMI	3	4	2	1	7.5W+15W subwoofer	270W	196	39×25×23	
Super Fine Pitch (16:9 screen)	KD-34XS955N	34"	28"	Native	ATSC	HDMI	3	4	2	1	7.5W+15W subwoofer	250W	205	39×25×23	Removes anti-glare screen coating from standard KD-34XS955
Super Fine Pitch (16:9 screen)	KD-34XS955	34"	28"	Native	ATSC	HDMI	3	4	2	1	7.5W+15W subwoofer	250W	205	39×25×23	User Manual
Super Fine Pitch (16:9 screen)	KV-34XBR910	34"	28"	Native	NTSC	DVI/HDCP	3	4	2	1	7.5W+15W subwoofer	280W	199	39×25×23	
Super Fine Pitch (16:9 screen)	KD-30XS955	30"	24"	Native	ATSC	HDMI	3	4	2	1	7.5W+15W subwoofer	220W	148	35×23×22	User Manual
Super Fine Pitch (16:9 screen)	KV-30XBR910	30"	24"	Native	NTSC	DVI/HDCP	3	4	2	1	7.5W+15W subwoofer	280W	155	35×23×22	
Hi-Scan with HDMI/DVI (16:9 screen)	KD-34XBR970	34"	28"	Native	ATSC	HDMI	3	3	2	1	10W	240W	190	39×25×23	Last Sony CRT HDTV released in North America
Hi-Scan with HDMI/DVI (16:9 screen)	KV-34HS420N	34"	28"	Native	NTSC	HDMI	3	4	2	1	10W	240W	194	39×25×23	Removes anti-glare screen coating from standard KV-34HS420
Hi-Scan with HDMI/DVI (16:9 screen)	KV-34HS420	34"	28"	Native	NTSC	HDMI	3	4	2	1	10W	240W	194	39×25×23	
Hi-Scan with HDMI/DVI (16:9 screen)	KV-34XBR800	34"	28"	Native	NTSC	DVI/HDCP	3	4	2	1	7.5W+15W subwoofer	330W	206	39×24×23	Installation Guide
Hi-Scan with HDMI/DVI (16:9 screen)	KV-34HS510	34"	28"	Native	NTSC	DVI/HDCP	3	4	2	1	7.5W+15W subwoofer	280W	201	39×24×23	User Manual
Hi-Scan with HDMI/DVI (16:9 screen)	KV-30HS420	30"	24"	Native	NTSC	HDMI	3	4	2	1	10W	240W	150	35×23×22	
Hi-Scan with HDMI/DVI (16:9 screen)	KV-30HS510	30"	24"	Native	NTSC	DVI/HDCP	3	4	2	1	7.5W+15W subwoofer	280W	167	35×22×22	User Manual
Hi-Scan with HDMI/DVI (4:3 screen)	KV-40XBR800	37"	40"	Auto	NTSC	DVI	3	4	2	1	7.5W+15W subwoofer	280W	300	43×33×26	
Hi-Scan with HDMI/DVI (4:3 screen)	KV-36XBR800	33"	36"	Auto	NTSC	DVI/HDCP	3	4	2	1	7.5W+15W subwoofer	280W	240	40×31×25	
Hi-Scan with HDMI/DVI (4:3 screen)	KV-36HS510	33"	36"	Auto	NTSC	DVI/HDCP	3	4	2	1	7.5W+15W subwoofer	280W	230	40×30×25	User Manual
Hi-Scan with HDMI/DVI (4:3 screen)	KV-36HS500	33"	36"	Auto	NTSC	DVI/HDCP	3	4	2	1	7.5W+15W subwoofer	280W	230	40×30×25	
Hi-Scan with HDMI/DVI (4:3 screen)	KV-36HS420	33"	36"	Auto	NTSC	HDMI	3	4	2	1	10W	240W	230	39×30×25	
Hi-Scan with HDMI/DVI (4:3 screen)	KD-32XS945	29"	32"	Auto	ATSC	HDMI	3	4	2	1	7.5W+15W subwoofer	240W	178	35×27×23	
Hi-Scan with HDMI/DVI (4:3 screen)	KV-32HS420	29"	32"	Auto	NTSC	HDMI	2	4	2	1	10W	240W	165	35×27×23	
Hi-Scan with HDMI/DVI (4:3 screen)	KV-32XBR800	29"	32"	Auto	NTSC	DVI/HDCP									
Hi-Scan with HDMI/DVI (4:3 screen)	KV-32HS510	29"	32"	Auto	NTSC	DVI/HDCP	3	4	2	1	7.5W+15W subwoofer	280W	176	35×27×24	User Manual
Hi-Scan with HDMI/DVI (4:3 screen)	KV-32HS500	29"	32"	Auto	NTSC	DVI/HDCP	2	3	2	1	7.5W+15W subwoofer	280W	176	35×27×24	
Hi-Scan with HDMI/DVI (4:3 screen)	KV-32HV600	29"	32"	Auto	NTSC	DVI/HDCP	3	4	2	1	7.5W+15W subwoofer	280W	176	35×27×24	
Hi-Scan with HDMI/DVI (4:3 screen)	KV-27HS420	25"	27"	Auto	NTSC	HDMI	3	4	2	1	10W	240W	111	30×23×20	
Hi-Scan without HDMI/DVI (16:9 screen)	KD-34XBR2	34"	28"	Native	ATSC	N/A	4	4	2	1	15W	330W	206	39×24×23	
Hi-Scan without HDMI/DVI (16:9 screen)	KW-34HD1	34"	28"	Native	NTSC	N/A	2	3	1	2	15W	330W	196	37.8×24×23.2	First Sony CRT HDTV released in North America, has PIP
Hi-Scan without HDMI/DVI (4:3 screen)	KV-40XBR700	37"	40"	Auto	NTSC	N/A	3	4	2	1	7.5W+15W subwoofer	245W	304	43×33×26	
Hi-Scan without HDMI/DVI (4:3 screen)	KV-36XBR450H	33"	36"	Auto	NTSC	N/A	3	4	2	1	15W	245W	238	39×29×24	
Hi-Scan without HDMI/DVI (4:3 screen)	KV-36XBR450	33"	36"	Auto	NTSC	N/A	3	4	2	1	15W	245W	238	39×29×24	
Hi-Scan without HDMI/DVI (4:3 screen)	KV-36XBR400	33"	36"	Auto	NTSC	N/A	4	3	2	1	15W	245W	238	39×29×24	
Hi-Scan without HDMI/DVI (4:3 screen)	KV-36HS20	33"	36"	Auto	NTSC	N/A	3	4	2	1	15W	245W	238	39×29×24	
Hi-Scan without HDMI/DVI (4:3 screen)	KV-32XBR450	29"	32"	Auto	NTSC	N/A	3	4	2	1	15W	245W	185	35×26×27	
Hi-Scan without HDMI/DVI (4:3 screen)	KV-32XBR400	29"	32"	Auto	NTSC	N/A	4	3	2	1	15W	245W	185	35×26×27	
Hi-Scan without HDMI/DVI (4:3 screen)	KV-32HS20	29"	32"	Auto	NTSC	N/A	3	4	2	1	15W	245W	185	35×26×27	
480i with auto 16:9 enhancement (4:3 screen)	KD-36FS130	33"	36"	Auto	NTSC/ATSC/QAM	N/A	1	3	2	1	10W	185W	217	39×30×25	
480i with auto 16:9 enhancement (4:3 screen)	KV-36FS320	33"	36"	Auto	NTSC	N/A	1	3	2	1	10W	190W	223	40×30×25	
480i with auto 16:9 enhancement (4:3 screen)	KD-36FS170	33"	36"	Auto	NTSC/ATSC/QAM	N/A	1	2	1	1	5W	160W	215	39×30×25	
480i with auto 16:9 enhancement (4:3 screen)	KV-36FS210	33"	36"	Auto	NTSC	N/A	1	3	2	2	10W	195W	223	40×30×25	
480i with auto 16:9 enhancement (4:3 screen)	KV-36FV280	33"	36"	Auto	NTSC	N/A	2								
480i with auto 16:9 enhancement (4:3 screen)	KV-36FV310	33"	36"	Auto	NTSC	N/A	2	3	2	2	7.5W+15W subwoofer	235W	228	40×30×25	10-bit 3D ATSC comb filter, 2-tuner PIP, FV310's decouple secondary voltage regulation from the flyback, improving high voltage regulation. This change improves CRT bloom.
480i with auto 16:9 enhancement (4:3 screen)	KV-36FV300	33"	36"	Auto	NTSC	N/A	2	3	1	2	7.5W+15W subwoofer	230W	225	40×30×25	3D-Y/C digital comb filter
480i with auto 16:9 enhancement (4:3 screen)	KV-36FS200	33"	36"	Auto	NTSC	N/A	1	3	1	2	10W	195W	216	39×30×25	
480i with auto 16:9 enhancement (4:3 screen)	KV-36FS120	33"	36"	Auto	NTSC	N/A	1	3	1	1	10W	180W	216	38×20×24	3D ATSC Comb Filter
480i with auto 16:9 enhancement (4:3 screen)	KV-36FS100	33"	36"	Auto	NTSC	N/A	1	3	1	1	10W	190W	216	39×30×25	
480i with auto 16:9 enhancement (4:3 screen)	KV-36FV27	33"	36"	Auto	NTSC	N/A	2	3	1	1	15W	210W	236	38×30×25	
480i with auto 16:9 enhancement (4:3 screen)	KV-36FV26	33"	36"	Auto	NTSC	N/A	2	3	1	1	15W	200W	236	34×30×25	
480i with auto 16:9 enhancement (4:3 screen)	KV-36XBR250	33"	36"	Auto	NTSC	N/A	2	3	1	1	15W	200W	236	38×30×25	
480i with auto 16:9 enhancement (4:3 screen)	KD-32FS130	29"	32"	Auto	NTSC/ATSC/QAM	N/A	1	3	2	1	10W	185W	163	35×27×23	
480i with auto 16:9 enhancement (4:3 screen)	KD-32FS170	29"	32"	Auto	NTSC/ATSC	N/A	1	2	1	1	5w	160W	158	35×27×23	
480i with auto 16:9 enhancement (4:3 screen)	KV-32FS210	29"	32"	Auto	NTSC	N/A	1	3	2	2	10W	195W	167	35×27×23	
480i with auto 16:9 enhancement (4:3 screen)	KV-32FS320	29"	32"	Auto	NTSC	N/A	1	2	2	1	10W	190W	167	35×27×23	
480i with auto 16:9 enhancement (4:3 screen)	KV-32FV280	29"	32"	Auto	NTSC	N/A	2								
480i with auto 16:9 enhancement (4:3 screen)	KV-32FV310	29"	32"	Auto	NTSC	N/A	2	3	2	2	7.5W+15W subwoofer	215W	175	35×27×23	10-bit 3D ATSC comb filter, 2-tuner PIP, FV310's decouple secondary voltage regulation from the flyback, improving high voltage regulation. This change improves CRT bloom.
480i with auto 16:9 enhancement (4:3 screen)	KV-32FV300	29"	32"	Auto	NTSC	N/A	2	3	1	2	7.5W+15W subwoofer	230W	172	35×27×23	3D-Y/C digital comb filter
480i with auto 16:9 enhancement (4:3 screen)	KV-32FS200	29"	32"	Auto	NTSC	N/A	1	3	1	2	10W	195W	165	35×27×23	
480i with auto 16:9 enhancement (4:3 screen)	KV-32FS120	29"	32"	Auto	NTSC	N/A	1	3	1	1	10W	175W	165	35x27x23	3D ATSC Comb Filter
480i with auto 16:9 enhancement (4:3 screen)	KV-32FS100	29"	32"	Auto	NTSC	N/A	1	3	1	1	10W	190W	165	35×27×23	
480i with auto 16:9 enhancement (4:3 screen)	KV-32FV27	29"	32"	Auto	NTSC	N/A	2	3	1	1	15W	210W	176	35×27×23	
480i with auto 16:9 enhancement (4:3 screen)	KV-32FV26	29"	32"	Auto	NTSC	N/A	2	3	1	1	15W	200W	176	35×27×23	
480i with auto 16:9 enhancement (4:3 screen)	KV-32XBR250	29"	32"	Auto	NTSC	N/A	2	3	1	1	15W	200W	175	35×27×23	
480i with auto 16:9 enhancement (4:3 screen)	KD-27FS130	25"	27"	Auto	NTSC/ATSC/QAM	N/A	1	3	2	1	10W	175W	103	30×23×20	
480i with auto 16:9 enhancement (4:3 screen)	KV-27FS320	25"	27"	Auto	NTSC	N/A	1	3	2	1	10W	180W	104	31×24×20	
480i with auto 16:9 enhancement (4:3 screen)	KD-27FS170	25"	27"	Auto	NTSC/ATSC/QAM	N/A	1	2	1	1	5W	130W	98	30×23×20	User Manual Last Sony CRT SDTV released in North America.
480i with auto 16:9 enhancement (4:3 screen)	KV-27FS210	25"	27"	Auto	NTSC	N/A	1	3	2	2	10W	175W	103	31×24×20	
480i with auto 16:9 enhancement (4:3 screen)	KV-27FV280	25"	27"	Auto	NTSC	N/A	2								
480i with auto 16:9 enhancement (4:3 screen)	KV-27FV310	25"	27"	Auto	NTSC	N/A	2	3	2	2	7.5W+15W subwoofer	215W	111	31×24×20	10-bit 3D ATSC comb filter, 2-tuner PIP, FV310's decouple secondary voltage regulation from the flyback, improving high voltage regulation. This change improves CRT bloom.
480i with auto 16:9 enhancement (4:3 screen)	KV-27FV300	25"	27"	Auto	NTSC	N/A	2	3	1	2	7.5W+15W subwoofer	220W	106	31×24×20	3D-Y/C digital comb filter
480i with auto 16:9 enhancement (4:3 screen)	KV-27FS200	25"	27"	Auto	NTSC	N/A	1	3	1	2	20W	185W	109	30×23×20	
480i with auto 16:9 enhancement (4:3 screen)	KV-27FS120	25"	27"	Auto	NTSC	N/A	1	3	1	1	20W	180W	100	30×23×20	3D ATSC Comb Filter
480i with auto 16:9 enhancement (4:3 screen)	KV-27FS100L	25"	27"	Auto	NTSC	N/A	1	3	1	1	10W	180W	100	30×23×19	
480i with auto 16:9 enhancement (4:3 screen)	KV-27FS100	25"	27"	Auto	NTSC	N/A	1	3	1	1	20W	180W	109	30×23×20	
480i with auto 16:9 enhancement (4:3 screen)	KV-27FV17	25"	27"	Auto	NTSC	N/A	2	3	1	1	15W	220W	108	27×24×20	
480i with manual 16:9 enhancement (4:3 screen)	KV-36FS17	33"	36"	Manual	NTSC	N/A	1	3	1	1	10W	200W	220	35×31×25	
480i with manual 16:9 enhancement (4:3 screen)	KV-36FV16	33"	36"	Manual	NTSC	N/A	2	3	1	1	15W	200W	236	34×30×25	
480i with manual 16:9 enhancement (4:3 screen)	KV-36FS16	33"	36"	Manual	NTSC	N/A	1	3	1	2	5W	190W	220	36×31×26	3-line digital comb filter, 2-tuner PIP
480i with manual 16:9 enhancement (4:3 screen)	KV-36FV15	33"	36"	Manual	NTSC	N/A	2	3	1	1	15W	200W	236	38×30×25	
480i with manual 16:9 enhancement (4:3 screen)	KV-36FS13	33"	36"	Manual	NTSC	N/A	1	3	1	1	10W	200W	220	35×31×25	
480i with manual 16:9 enhancement (4:3 screen)	KV-36FS12	33"	36"	Manual	NTSC	N/A	1	3	1	1	5W	190W	220	36×31×26	
480i with manual 16:9 enhancement (4:3 screen)	KV-32FS17	29"	32"	Manual	NTSC	N/A	1	3	1	1	10W	205W	163	31×27×23	
480i with manual 16:9 enhancement (4:3 screen)	KV-32FV16	29"	32"	Manual	NTSC	N/A	2	3	1	1	15W	200W	176	35×27×23	
480i with manual 16:9 enhancement (4:3 screen)	KV-32FS16	29"	32"	Manual	NTSC	N/A	1	3	1	1	5W	170W	162	31×27×23	
480i with manual 16:9 enhancement (4:3 screen)	KV-32FV15	29"	32"	Manual	NTSC	N/A	2	3	1	1	15W	200W	176	35×27×23	
480i with manual 16:9 enhancement (4:3 screen)	KV-32FS13	29"	32"	Manual	NTSC	N/A	1	3	1	1	10W	195W	163	31×27×23	
480i with manual 16:9 enhancement (4:3 screen)	KV-32FS12	29"	32"	Manual	NTSC	N/A	1	3	1	1	5W	165W	162	31×27×23	
480i with manual 16:9 enhancement (4:3 screen)	KV-27FS17	25"	27"	Manual	NTSC	N/A	1	3	1	1	15W	180W	103	27×25×20	
480i with manual 16:9 enhancement (4:3 screen)	KV-27FV16	25"	27"	Manual	NTSC	N/A	2	3	1	1	15W	220W	107	30×23×20	
480i with manual 16:9 enhancement (4:3 screen)	KV-27FS16	25"	27"	Manual	NTSC	N/A	1	3	1	1	10W	170W	103	27×25×20	
480i with manual 16:9 enhancement (4:3 screen)	KV-27FV15	25"	27"	Manual	NTSC	N/A	2	3	0	1	15W	165W	110	30×23×19	
480i with manual 16:9 enhancement (4:3 screen)	KV-27FS13	25"	27"	Manual	NTSC	N/A	1	2	1	1	15W	170W	103	27×25×20	
480i with manual 16:9 enhancement (4:3 screen)	KV-27FS12	25"	27"	Manual	NTSC	N/A	1	2	1	1	10W	160W	99	27×25×20	
480i with manual 16:9 enhancement (4:3 screen)	KV-24FV300	22"	24"	Manual	NTSC	N/A	1	2	1	1	10W	180W	81.57	27×20×19	
480i with manual 16:9 enhancement (4:3 screen)	KV-24FS120	22"	24"	Manual	NTSC	N/A	1	2	1	1	10W	165W	72.3	28×20×19	
480i with manual 16:9 enhancement (4:3 screen)	KV-20FS120	18"	20"	Manual	NTSC	N/A	0	2	1	1	5W	140W	55	24×18×19	Final 20" model produced for North America.
480i without 16:9 enhancement (4:3 screen)	KV-36XBR200	33"	36"	None	NTSC	N/A	1	2	1	2	15W	240W	236	39×30×24	User Manual
480i without 16:9 enhancement (4:3 screen)	KV-36FS10	33"	36"	None	NTSC	N/A	2	3	1	1	10W	190W	236	38×30×25	
480i without 16:9 enhancement (4:3 screen)	KV-36FV1	33"	36"	None	NTSC	N/A	2	3	1	1	15W	240W	236	39×30×24	
480i without 16:9 enhancement (4:3 screen)	KV-32XBR200	29"	32"	None	NTSC	N/A	1	2	1	2	15W	240W	175	35×27×23	User Manual
480i without 16:9 enhancement (4:3 screen)	KV-32FV1	29"	32"	None	NTSC	N/A	2	3	1	1	15W	240W	175	35×27×23	
480i without 16:9 enhancement (4:3 screen)	KV-24FS100	22"	24"	None	NTSC	N/A	1	2	1	1	7.5W	145W	77	28×21×18	
480i without 16:9 enhancement (4:3 screen)	KV-24FV10	22"	24"	None	NTSC	N/A	1	2	0	1	10W	150W	88	26×21×18	
480i without 16:9 enhancement (4:3 screen)	KV-24FV12	22"	24"	None	NTSC	N/A	1	2	0	1	10W	170W	81	25×20×18	
480i without 16:9 enhancement (4:3 screen)	KV-20FS100	18"	20"	None	NTSC	N/A	0	2	1	1	10W	120W	55	23×18×19	
480i without 16:9 enhancement (4:3 screen)	KV-20FV10	18"	20"	None	NTSC	N/A	1	2	0	1	5W	115W	59	22×18×20	
480i without 16:9 enhancement (4:3 screen)	KV-20FV12	18"	20"	None	NTSC	N/A	1	2	0	1	5W	115W	59	22×18×19	3-line digital comb filter, succeeded by the 20FV300 near end of production, User Manual
480i without 16:9 enhancement (4:3 screen)	KV-20FV300	18"	20"	None	NTSC	N/A	1	2	1	1	10W	155W	59	24×18×19	Final 20" model produced with all available analog inputs in North America. 3D-Y/C digital comb filter User manual , Service Manual
480i without 16:9 enhancement (4:3 screen)	KV-13FS110	12"	13"	None	NTSC	N/A	0	2	1	1	5W	100W	26	16×13×16	Smallest FD Trinitron produced. Same specs as the 13FS100 except for chassis color, which was switched to a white finish.
480i without 16:9 enhancement (4:3 screen)	KV-13FS100	12"	13"	None	NTSC	N/A	0	2	1	1	5W	100W	26	16×13×16	Smallest FD Trinitron produced. Silver finish chassis.

== See also ==
- XBR (Sony)
