= Wega =

WEGA, Wega, or WeGA may refer to:

- WeGA or Carl-Maria-von-Weber-Gesamtausgabe, a scientific-critical edition of the works of the composer Carl Maria von Weber
- WEGA, a German electronics manufacturer, acquired by Sony Corporation
- WEGA (AM) (1350 AM, Candelita7), a radio station licensed to Vega Baja, Puerto Rico
- Vega, a star in the constellation Lyra, also known as Wega
- Wega (horse), a horse participating in 2012 Olympics equestrian events
- WEGA (stellarator), an early version of the Hybrid Illinois Device for Research and Applications
- Wiener Einsatzgruppe Alarmabteilung, a SWAT team in Vienna, Austria
- WEGA – Die Spezialeinheit der Polizei, an Austrian TV series about the Wiener Einsatzgruppe Alarmabteilung
- Wega Industria Aeronautica, Brazilian manufacturer of aircraft including the Wega 180
- FV Wega, a German fishing trawler in service 1933–39 and 1945–55
- Wega, a station on the Wabern–Bad Wildungen railway, Hesse, Germany
- Waya Island, Fiji, formerly spelled Wega
- FD Trinitron/WEGA, Sony's series of flat picture tubes

== See also ==
- Vega (disambiguation), many senses have Wega as a variant spelling
- Tony Wegas (born 1965) Austrian singer and actor
- Germanvox–Wega, 1967–70 professional cycling team
