= Sony Technology Center-Pittsburgh =

Former American television manufacturing plant

- Operated: 1990–2010
- Location: 1001 Technology Drive; Mt. Pleasant, Pennsylvania, United States
- Industry: Electronics
- Products: Televisions
- Employees: 3,000
- Owner: Sony Corporation of America

Sony Technology Center-Pittsburgh, also known as STC-P, was a manufacturing complex owned by Sony, and was located 35 miles (56 km) southeast of Pittsburgh in Westmoreland County, Pennsylvania, United States, near New Stanton. The facility used to produce Trinitron CRT-based and rear projection televisions before shifting to LCD production in the mid-2000s, and ultimately closing in 2010. As of 2026, the site is marketed as RIDC Westmoreland and is owned by RIDC, the Regional Industrial Development Corporation of Southwestern Pennsylvania.

== Background ==
The site was formerly the Volkswagen Westmoreland Assembly plant, which was operated from 1978 to 1988, originally known by Chrysler as the New Stanton plant.

== History ==
In April 1990, Sony Corporation of America announced it would acquire and convert the shuttered 2.8 million-square-foot Volkswagen auto assembly plant in East Huntingdon Township, Pennsylvania into a $300 million picture tube manufacturing facility.

In February 1991, after the former Volkswagen plant was transferred in October 1990, Sony announced it would expand its Westmoreland manufacturing operations to include complete television assembly, in addition to its previously announced picture-tube manufacturing.

In 1992, the facility began producing televisions, a CRT-based rear-projection model with a 53-inch screen, becoming Sony's second television manufacturing plant in the United States after the Sony Technology Center in San Diego, California. Originally, picture tubes were shipped from San Diego to the facility due to a delay in picture tube manufacturing until early 1994.

In November 1994, Sony announced a partnership with Corning Inc. and Asahi Glass America Inc. to form a joint venture, named "American Video Glass Company". The joint venture produces television glass at the Westmoreland plant, and was opened on October 9, 1997. The facility employed more than 3,000 people in the late 1990s, and was being the world's first vertical integrated television manufacturing plant.

In January 2006, Sony announced it would shut down the American Video Glass Company subsidiary by the end of May, laying off about 300 employees, along with ending picture tube production at the plant. In late 2006, Sony sold its 700,000-square-foot facility near the plant, that was used for the American Video Glass Company, to Commonwealth Renewable Energy Inc., a unit of the Anderson Group of Companies, with plans to convert the site into an ethanol production facility.

In March 2007, due to failing demand for rear projection televisions, Sony announced it would face layoffs at its Westmoreland County, Pennsylvania, manufacturing plant, cutting roughly 300 jobs immediately and up to 600 more over the following year, threatening 900 of 1,150 jobs.

On December 9, 2008, Sony announced it would shut down its television manufacturing plant in Westmoreland County, Pennsylvania, laying off about 560 employees, and shifting production to its Sony Baja California plant in Tijuana, Mexico. Television production ceased at Sony's Westmoreland manufacturing plant in February 2009. Later in March 2010, Sony closed the 2,000,000 square feet (190,000 m^{2}) building in Westmoreland County.
