= Sharp NEC Display Solutions =

Display manufacturer

Logo of Sharp NEC Display Solutions

Sharp NEC Display Solutions (Sharp/NEC; formerly NEC Display Solutions or NDS and NEC-Mitsubishi Electric Visual Systems or NEC-Mitsubishi or NM Visual) is a manufacturer of computer monitors and large-screen public-information displays, and has sold and marketed products under the NEC brand globally for more than twenty years. The company sells display products to the consumer, business, professional (e.g. financial, graphic design, CAD/CAM), digital signage and medical markets.

The company again became a joint venture of Sharp and NEC Corporation when NEC sold 66% to Sharp on March 25, 2020. Prior to that date, it was a wholly owned subsidiary of Japan-based NEC Corporation since March 31, 2005. Originally, the company was known as NEC-Mitsubishi, a 50/50 joint venture between NEC Corporation and Mitsubishi Electric that began in 2000, and sold display products under both the NEC and Mitsubishi brands. The company is no longer affiliated with Mitsubishi.

== Brands ==
- NEC MultiSync - line of LCD and CRT monitors and large format public displays designed for business applications, lifestyle and gaming.
- NEC AccuSync - line of LCD and CRT monitors designed for home and office applications.
- NEC SpectraView - line of LCD monitors designed for color sensitive graphics applications.
- NEC SpectraView Reference - a line of LCD monitors designed for color critical professional applications
- NEC MD Series - line of LCD monitors designed for medical diagnostic imaging applications.
- NEC MULTEOS - line of LCD monitors designed for public demonstrations.

== See also ==
- Cromaclear
- Diamondtron
