= Sony PVM-4300 =

Largest CRT display ever produced

Sony Trinitron KX-45ED1
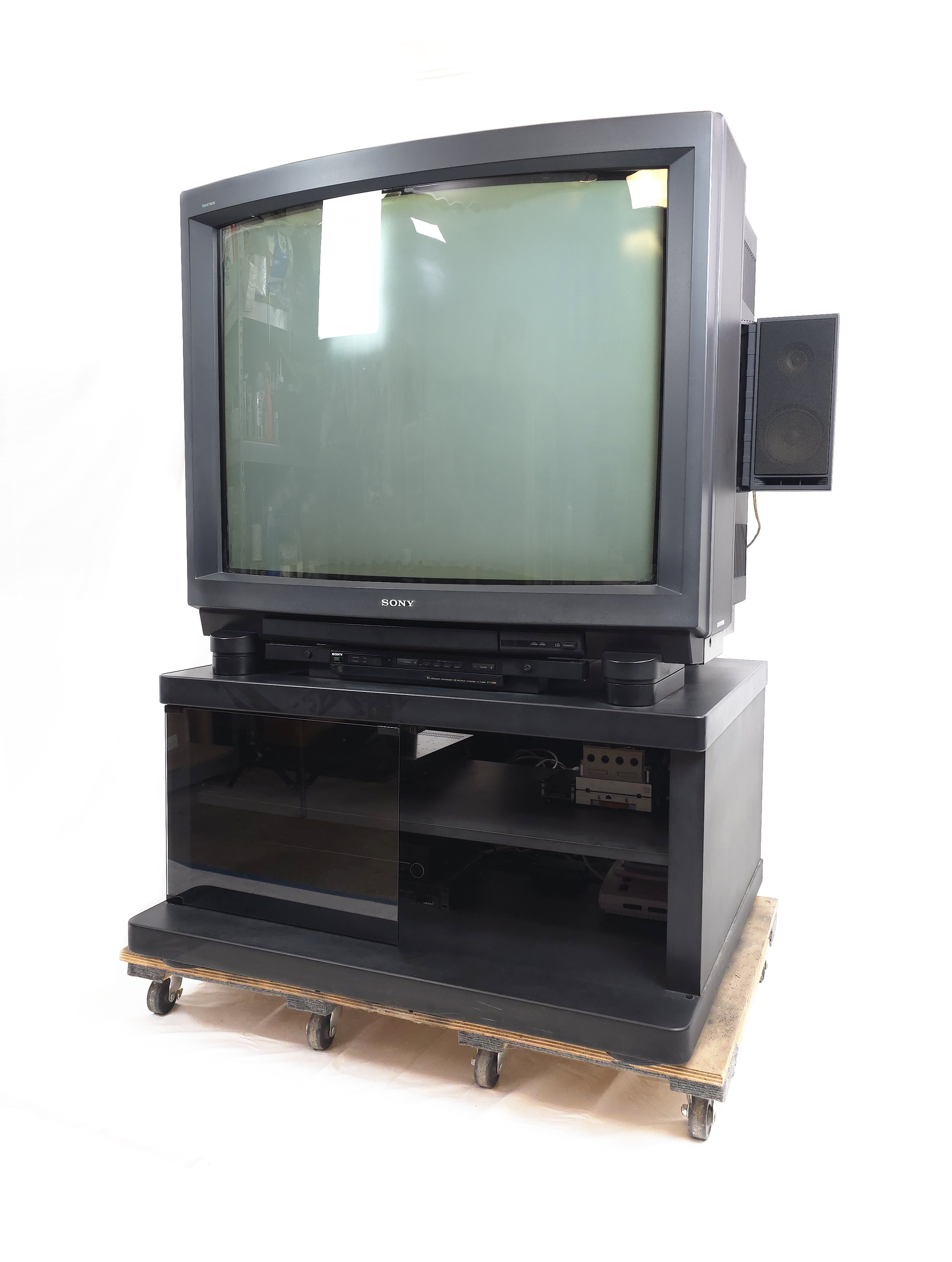
- Front left face view of the monitor, with the included TV stand
- Manufacturer: Sony
- Product family: Trinitron, PVM
- Type: CRT video monitor
- Released: JP: April 1989; US: 1990
- Introductory price: ¥2,600,000; US$39,999.99
- Units shipped: US: c. 20
- Display: 45-inch (43-inch viewable) aperture grille cathode-ray tube
- Dimensions: 105 × 92.5 × 76.7 cm (41.3 × 36.4 × 30.1 in)
- Weight: 199.6 kg (440 lb)
- Marketing target: Professional, videophile
- Related: Sony Trinitron KX-45ED1T
- Made in: Japan

The Sony Trinitron KX-45ED1, also known as the PVM-4300, is a cathode-ray tube (CRT) monitor released by Sony in 1989. It is the largest CRT monitor ever manufactured, with a 43-inch (110 cm) diagonal display and a weight of around 200 kilograms (440 lb). Development of the display was finished in September 1987; it was put on sale in Japan in April 1989 and in the United States in 1990.

When documentary evidence of the monitor declined following its release, the monitor became famous among CRT enthusiasts. In 2022, the only known extant unit was rediscovered in Osaka, Japan and acquired by a collector.

== History ==
=== Development ===
In the late 1980s, Sony began developing a 43-inch display tube, which was finished in September 1987. The PVM-4300 was unveiled in a 1988 issue of the Japanese DIGIC magazine and in American tech publications, with no official release date given.

Jim Palumbo, president of Sony's Consumer Display Products Co., said that the PVM-4300 was a "positioning statement" with potential to become a standard part of Sony's CRT catalog, even if not many were sold. Workers assembled the monitors by hand.

=== Release and sales ===
The PVM-4300 was released by Sony in Japan in April 1989 for an introductory price of ¥2.6 million in Japan. Around twenty sets were imported into the United States around January 1990, with an introductory price of $39,999.99 ($103,890 in 2025). It was described as being aimed at the "videophile and elite-consumer market."

In April 1990, Jim Palumbo reported to the Sun Sentinel that only three PVM-4300 sets had been sold in the United States, although a month earlier he had told the Chicago Tribune that "at least four or five" had been sold.

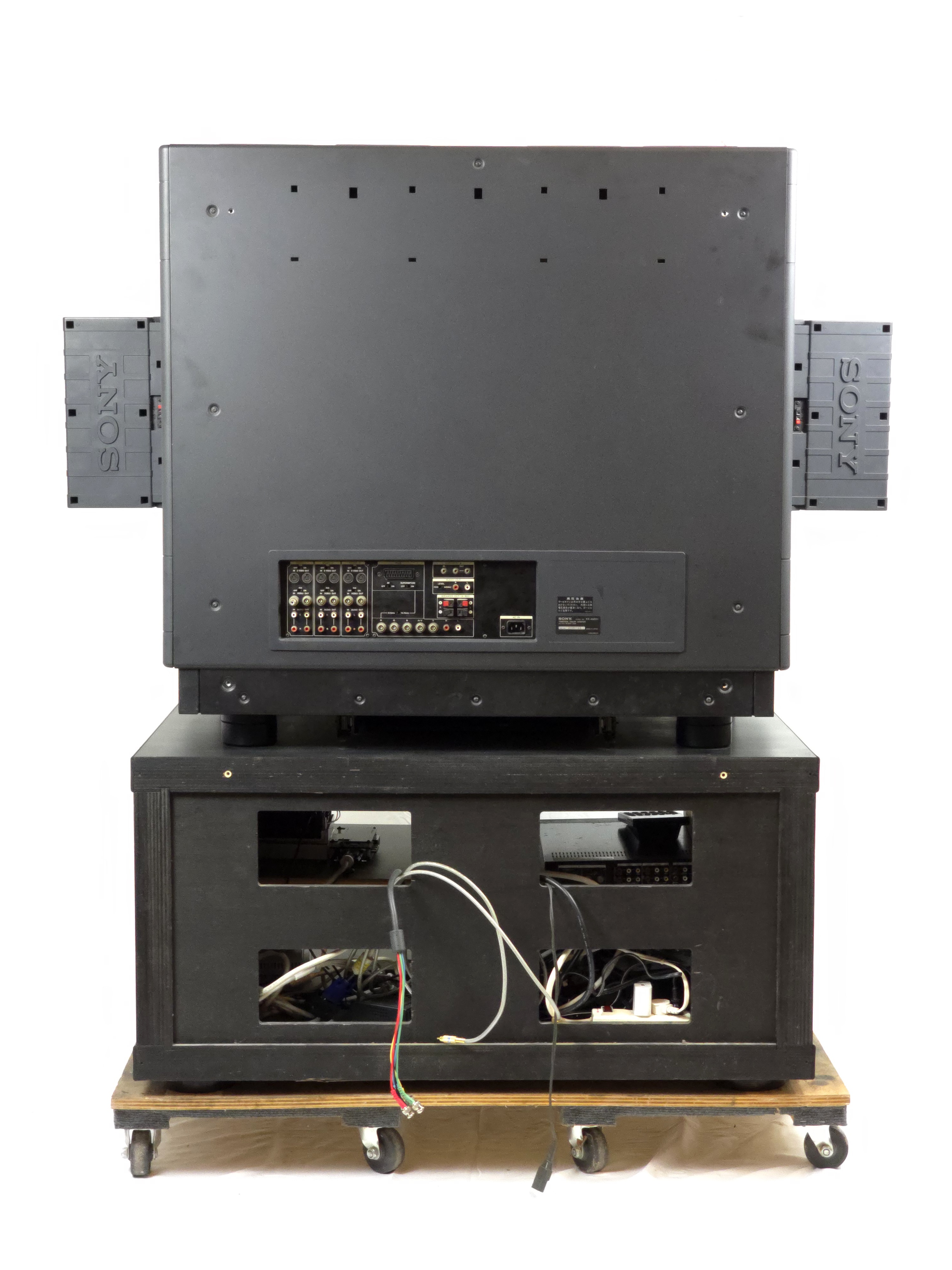
Back view of the monitor

=== Obscurity and conservation ===
Following its release in the late 1980s, photographic and documentary evidence of the monitor began to dry up, which, in addition to its limited release, gained it a somewhat legendary status among enthusiasts of CRT monitors.

In October 2022, American hardware modder and YouTuber Shank Mods tracked down a functional PVM-4300, one of the last, in the second-floor waiting room of Chikuma Soba, a soba noodle restaurant in Osaka, Japan. The location was due to close permanently for demolition only days after this discovery. Shank, with the help of a local and a heavy machinery freight company, arranged for the monitor to be shipped to the United States. Upon arrival, it was thoroughly tested, serviced and studied by enthusiasts.

== Specifications ==
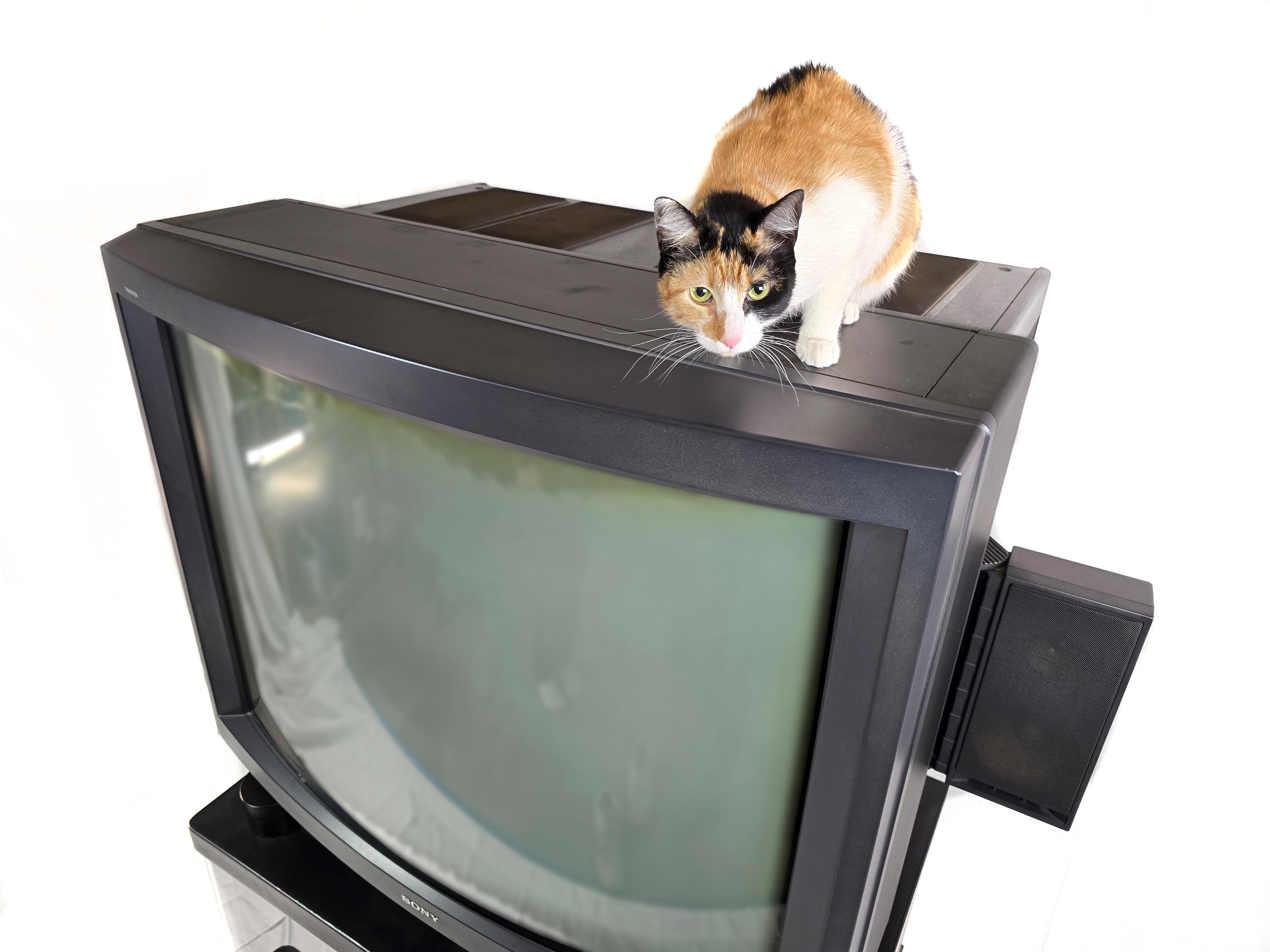
Top view of the monitor with a calico cat for scale

The PVM-4300 has a 45-inch (114 cm)—with a 43-inch (109 cm) viewing area—color Trinitron Microblack CRT picture tube, which is the largest ever produced. It can display a standard interlaced image as well as a 480p picture at a 60 Hz refresh rate, using improved-definition television (IDTV), which used a digital frame buffer to deinterlace video. The monitor contains two RGB inputs at 15.75 and 31.5 kHz to allow for native 480p inputs. It does not have a built-in TV tuner, although Shank Mods has said that a version called the KX-45ED1T was available on the Japanese market that bundled an external TV tuner, model VT-X5R, mounted in a drawer integrated to the bottom of the monitor chassis, and the included remote provided buttons to control it. The version he has is the KX-45ED1T.

According to CRT Database, the unit weighs 199.6 kg (440 lb), and measures at 105 × 92.5 × 76.7 cm (41.3 × 36.4 × 30.1 in).

== Reception ==
Eric Zorn of the Chicago Tribune expressed his astonishment at the size and of the cost of the PVM-4300, writing: "This TV set is to your TV set what your TV set is to an old Popsicle stick in the gutter with ants on it." A review in the Sun Sentinel expressed a similar sentiment to its cost and praised the monitor for its "brightness, clarity and sharpness of color." The review says that the PVM-4300 is a higher quality display than larger rear-projection television (RPTV) sets, but notes that RPTV technology has been improving. A 1989 issue of Video Review described it as the "best-looking, big-screen set we've ever seen", but also said it's "designed more as a statement than a conventional product."

Shank, after acquiring the set in 2022, described it as looking "incredible" in person.

== Gallery ==
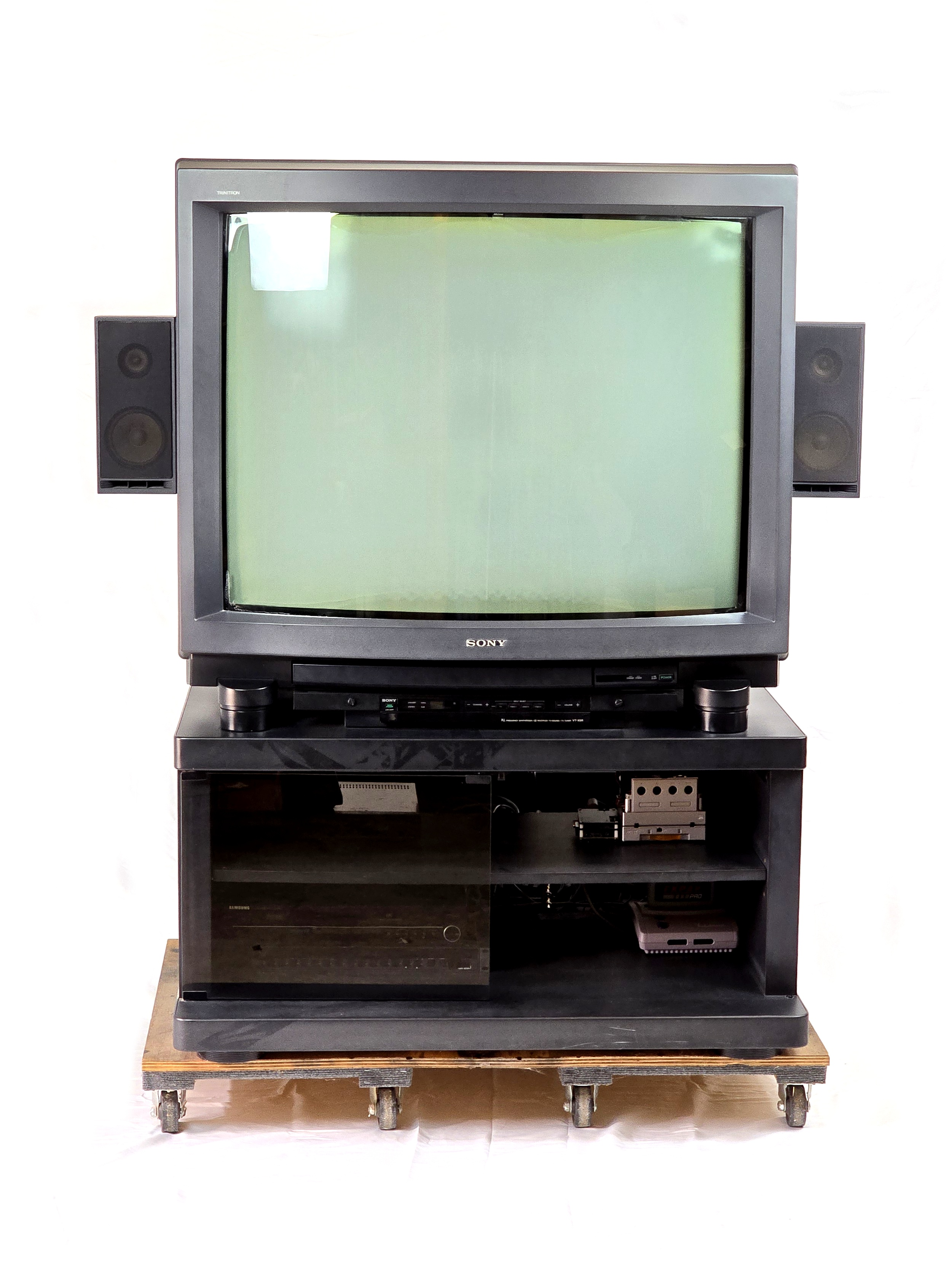
Front view of the set

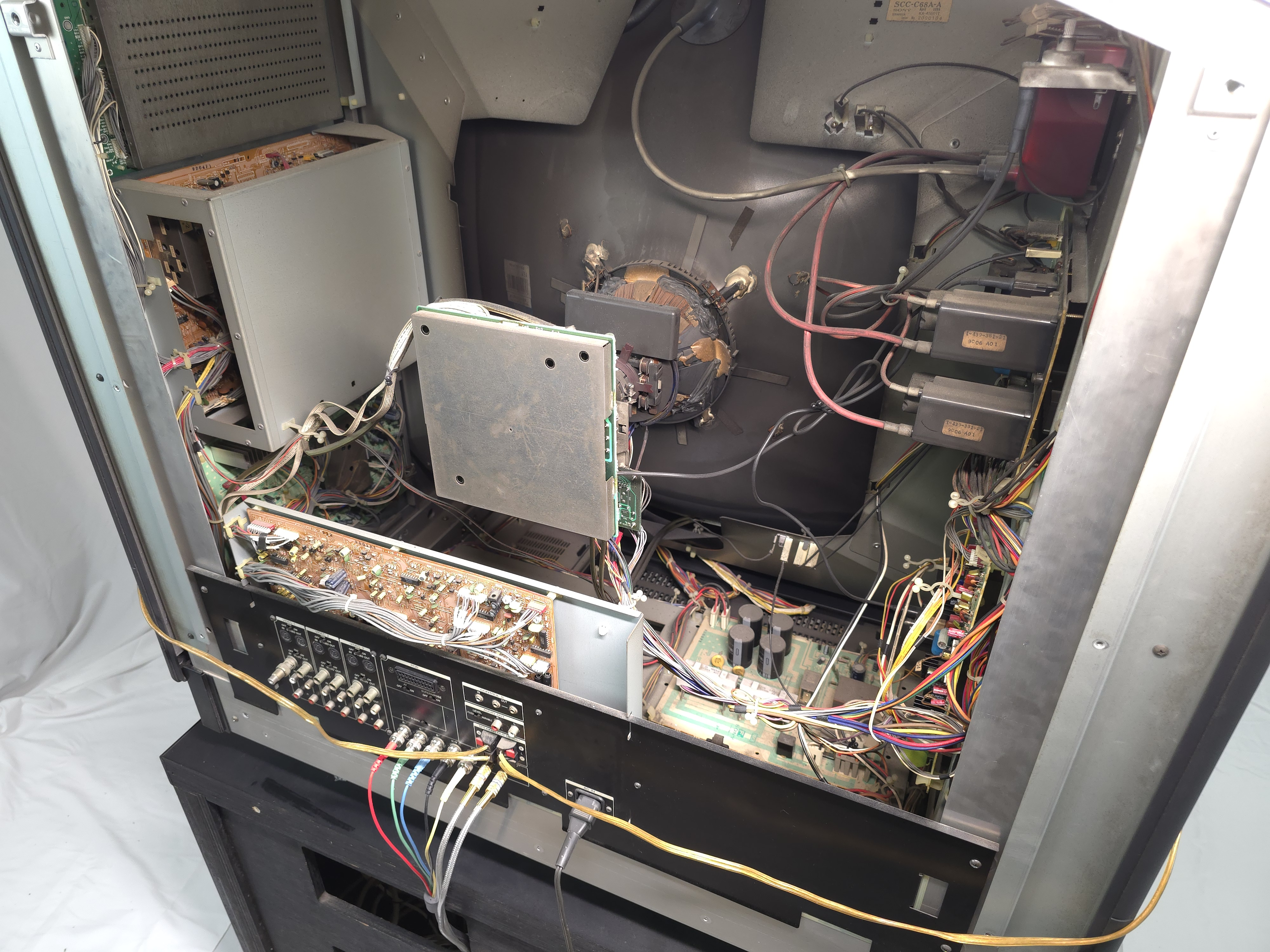
Internal view of the set, showing the electronic components inside

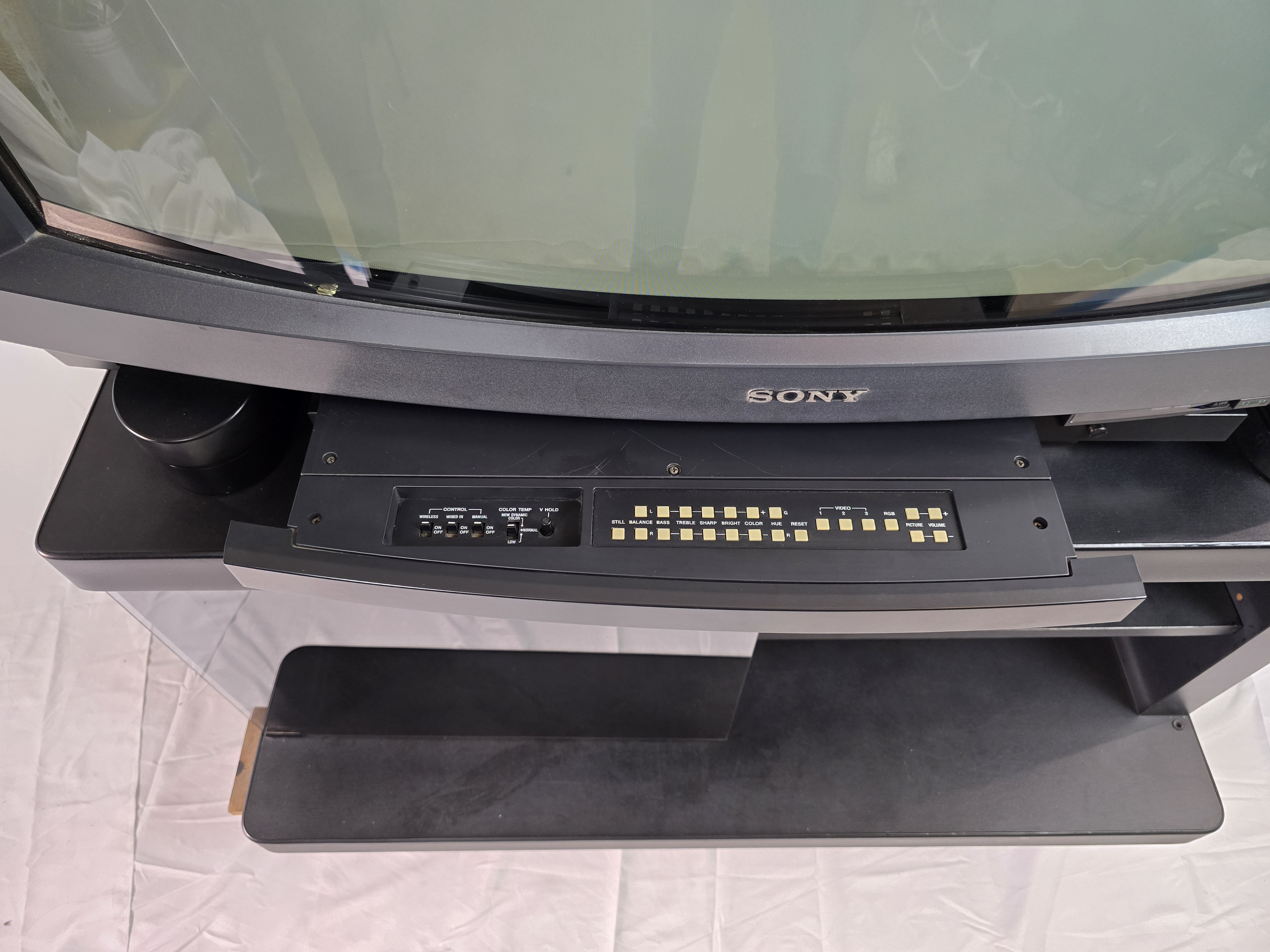
View of the slide-out control tray at the bottom of the monitor

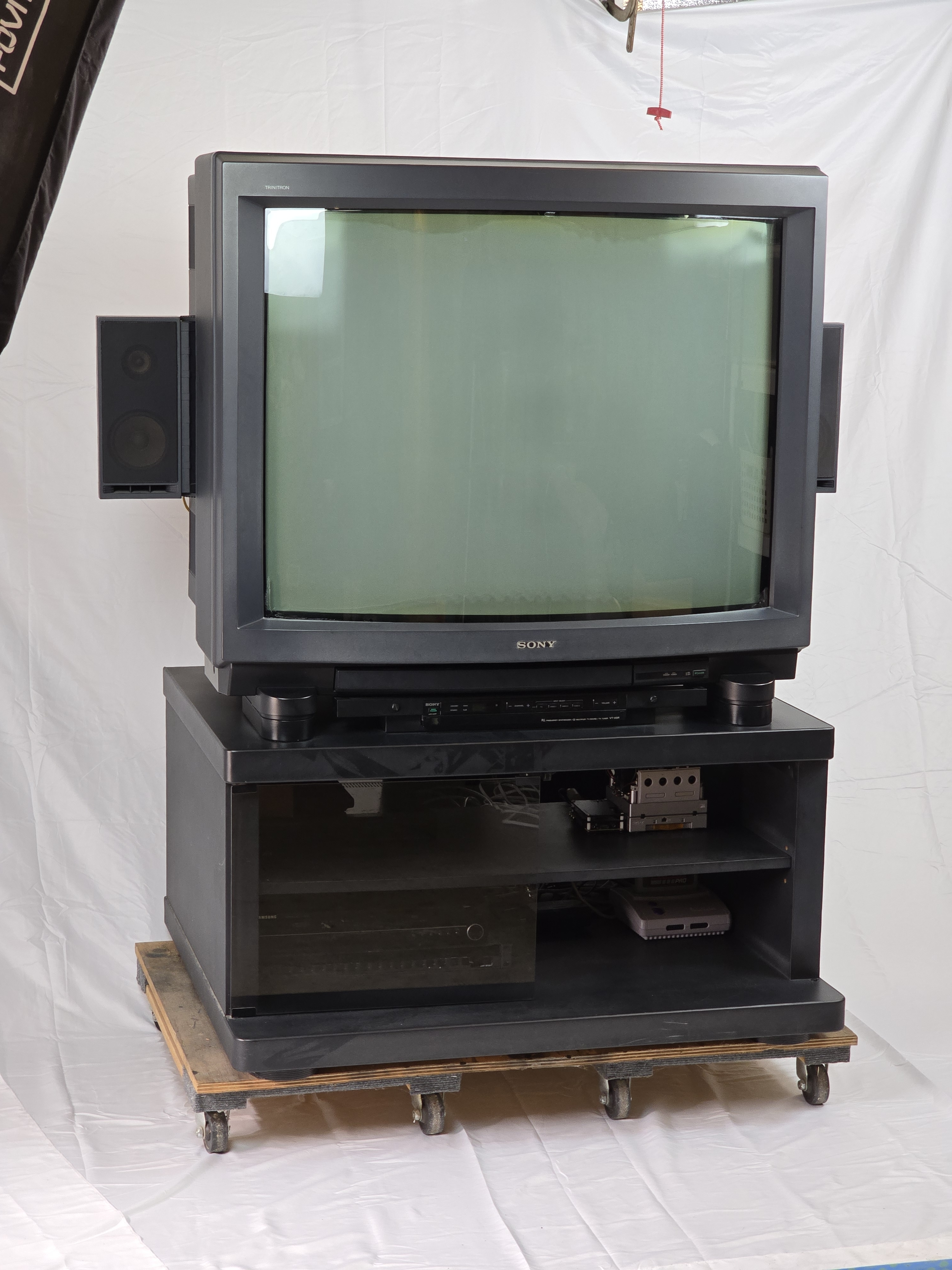
Front right face view of the set
