= Scale up =

Scale up, scale-up, or scaleup may refer to:

- Scalability, the ability to function with different amounts of required work, or to be readily adjusted to do so
- Scaleup company, a profitable and scalable business in its growth phase

== See also ==
- Image scaling, also known as "upscaling" an image
- SCALE-UP, a type classroom layout and learning environment
- Video scaler, also known as "upscaling" a video
