= Trinitron =

Series of CRT televisions and monitors manufactured by Sony from 1968 to 2008

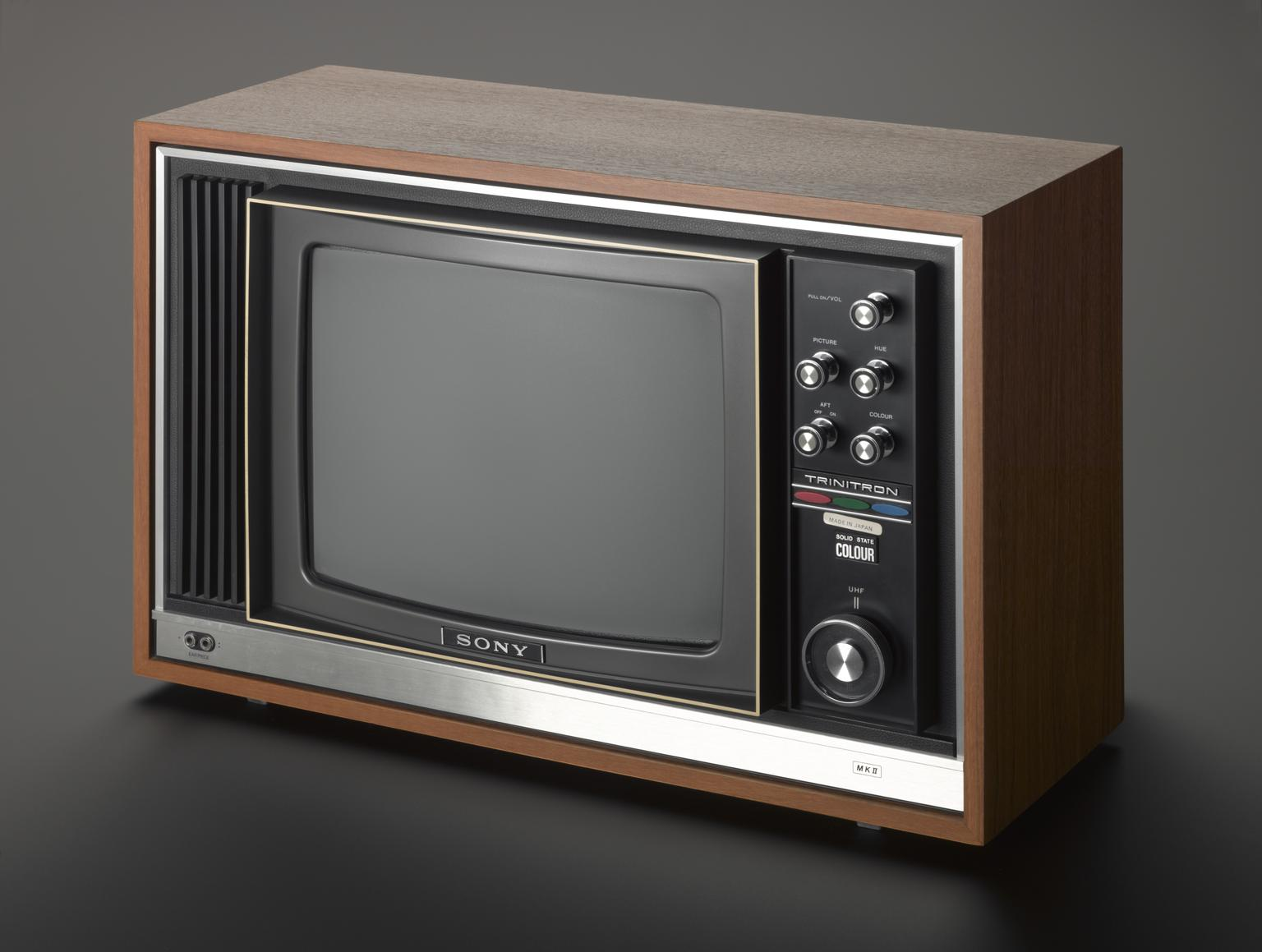
A Sony KV-1320UB Mark II Trinitron from the early 1970s

Trinitron was Sony's brand name for its line of aperture-grille-based CRTs used in television sets and computer monitors. The first Trinitron television was released in October 1968, and 100 million Trinitron systems had been sold by 1994.

At its peak 20 million Trinitron tubes were made annually. Patent protection on the basic Trinitron design ran out in 1996, and it quickly faced a number of competitors at much lower prices. The company then designed and shifted to flatscreen tubes, named FD Trinitron, before the industry shifted to LCD panels. Sony ended production from Japanese plants in 2004, and stopped selling them in the United States and Canada in 2006. Sony continued to sell Trinitrons in China, India, and regions of South America using tubes delivered from their Singapore plant until it ended production in March 2008. A total of 280 million units were built by the time when Trinitron production concluded.

The name Trinitron was derived from trinity, meaning the union of three, and tron from electron tube, after the way that the Trinitron combined the three separate electron guns of other CRT designs into one.

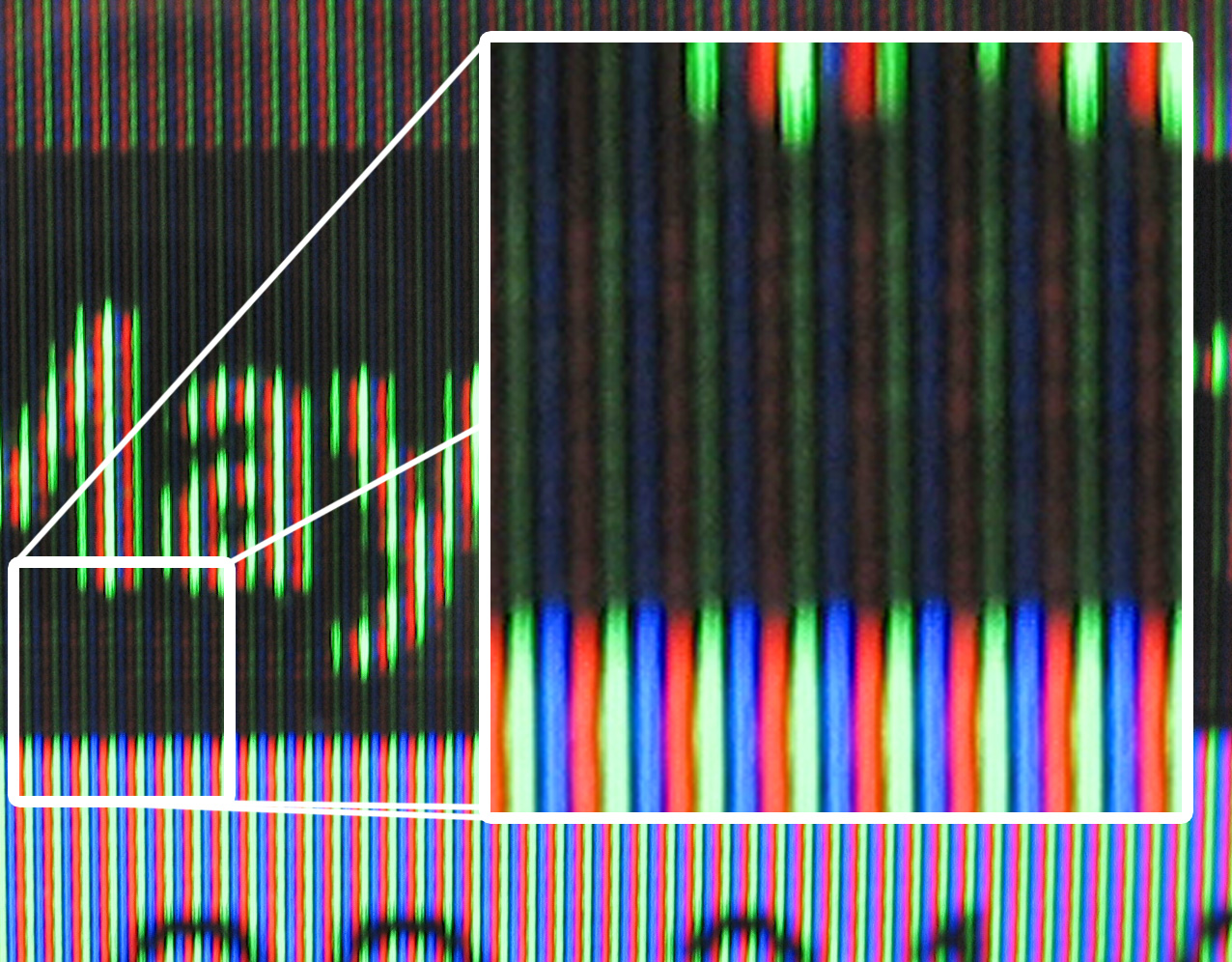
Close-up of phosphor bars on a 14" Sony Trinitron television

== History ==
=== Color television ===
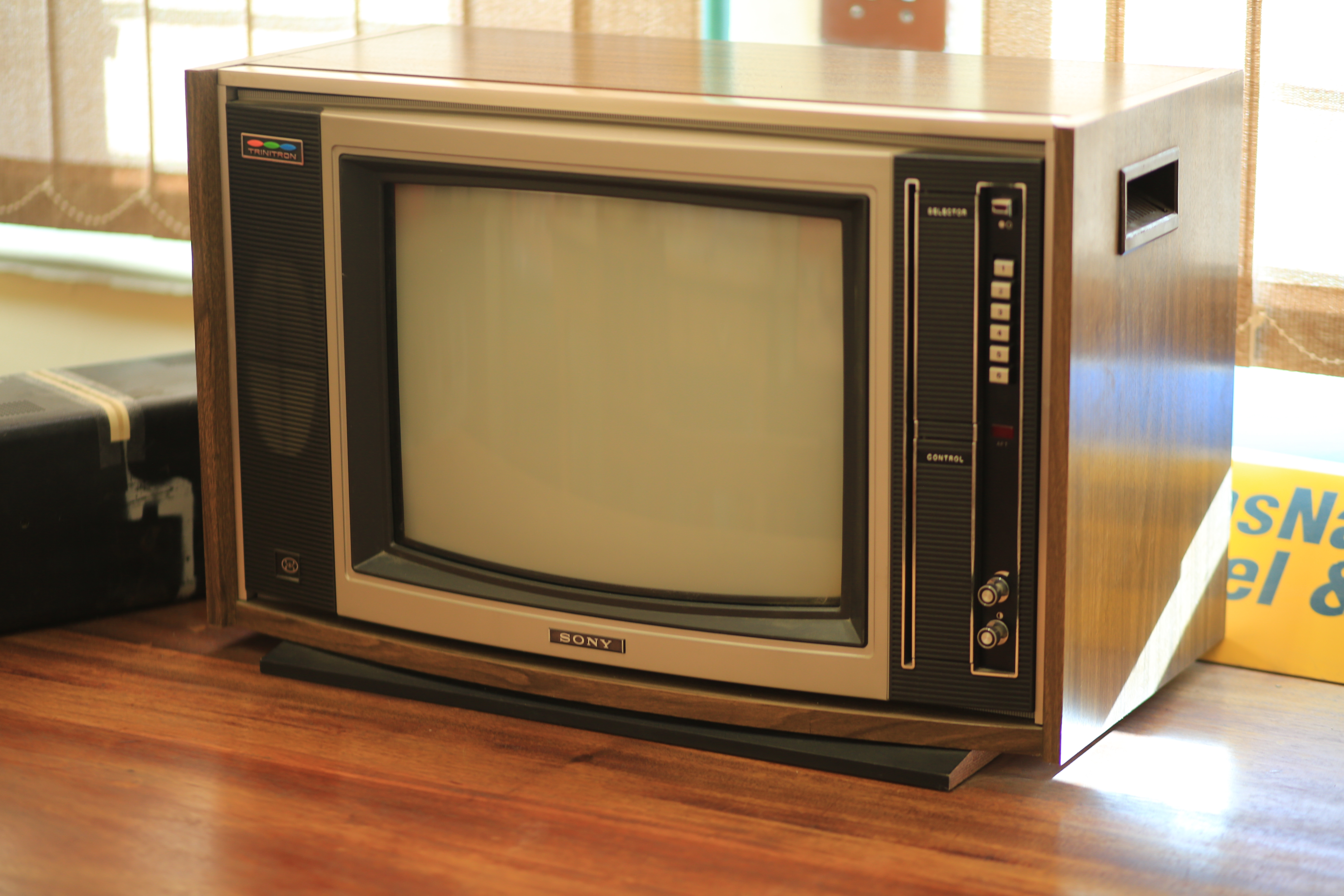
A Sony KV-191SA Trinitron television

Color television had been demonstrable since the 1920s starting with John Logie Baird's system. In the late 1940s it was perfected by both CBS and RCA. At the time, a number of systems were being proposed that used separate red, green and blue signals (RGB), broadcast in succession. Most systems broadcast entire frames in sequence, with a colored filter (or "gel") that rotated in front of an otherwise conventional black and white television tube.

Because they broadcast separate signals for the different colors, all of these systems were incompatible with existing black and white sets. Another problem was that the mechanical filter made them flicker unless very high refresh rates were used. In spite of these problems, the United States Federal Communications Commission selected a sequential-frame 144 frame/s standard from CBS as their color broadcast in 1950.

RCA worked along different lines entirely, using the luminance-chrominance system. This system did not directly encode or transmit the RGB signals; instead it combined these colors into one overall brightness figure, the "luminance". Luminance closely matched the black and white signal of existing broadcasts, allowing it to be displayed on existing televisions. This was a major advantage over the mechanical systems being proposed by other groups. Color information was then separately encoded and folded into the signal as a high-frequency modification to produce a composite video signal – on a black and white television this extra information would be seen as a slight randomization of the image intensity, but the limited resolution of existing sets made this invisible in practice.

On color sets the signal would be extracted, decoded back into RGB, and displayed. Although RCA's system had enormous benefits, it had not been successfully developed because it was difficult to produce the display tubes. Black and white TVs used a continuous signal and the tube could be coated with an even deposit of phosphor. With the compatible color encoding scheme originally developed by Georges Valensi in 1938, the color was changing continually along the line, which was far too fast for any sort of mechanical filter to follow. Instead, the phosphor had to be broken down into a discrete pattern of colored spots. Focusing the proper signal on each of these tiny spots was beyond the capability of electron guns of the era, and RCA's early experiments used three-tube projectors, or mirror-based systems known as "Triniscope".

=== Shadow masks ===
RCA eventually solved the problem of displaying the color images with their introduction of the shadow mask. The shadow mask consists of a thin sheet of steel with tiny holes photo etched into it, placed just behind the front surface of the picture tube. Three guns, arranged in a triangle, were all aimed at the holes. Stray electrons at the edge of the beam were cut off by the mask, creating a sharply focused spot that was small enough to hit a single colored phosphor on the screen. Since each of the guns was aimed at the hole from a slightly different angle, the spots of phosphor on the tube could be separated slightly to prevent overlap.

The disadvantage of this approach was that for any given amount of gun power, the shadow mask filtered out the majority of the energy. To ensure there was no overlap of the beam on the screen, the dots had to be separated and covered perhaps 25% of its surface. This led to very dim images, requiring much greater electron beam power in order to provide a useful picture. The system was highly dependent on the relative angles of the beams between the three guns, which required constant adjustment by the user to ensure the guns hit the correct colors. In spite of this, the technical superiority of the RCA system was overwhelming compared to the CBS system, and was selected as the new NTSC standard in 1953. The first broadcast using the new standard occurred on New Year's Day in 1954, when NBC broadcast the Tournament of Roses Parade.

In spite of this early start, only a few years after regularly scheduled television broadcasting had begun, consumer uptake of color televisions was very slow to start. The dim images, constant adjustments and high costs had kept them in a niche of their own. Low consumer acceptance led to a lack of color programming, further reducing the demand for the sets in a supply and demand problem. In the United States in 1960, only 1 color set was sold for every 50 sets sold in total.

=== Chromatron ===
Sony had entered the television market in 1960 with the black and white TV8-301, the first non-projection type all-transistor television. A combination of factors, including its small screen size, limited its sales to niche markets. Sony engineers had been studying the color market, but the situation in Japan was even worse than the U.S. They accounted for only 300 of the 9 million sets sold that year. By 1961, dealers were asking the Sony sales department when a color set would be available, and the sales department put pressure on engineering in turn. Masaru Ibuka, Sony's president and co-founder, steadfastly refused to develop a system based on RCA's shadow mask design, which he considered technically deficient. He insisted on developing a unique solution.

In 1961, a Sony delegation was visiting the IEEE trade show in New York City, including Ibuka, Akio Morita (Sony's other co-founder) and Nobutoshi Kihara, who was promoting his new CV-2000 home video tape recorder. This was Kihara's first trip abroad and he spent much of his time wandering the trade floor, where he came across a small booth by the small company Autometric. They were demonstrating a new type of color television based on the Chromatron tube, which used a single electron gun and a vertical grille of electrically charged thin wires instead of a shadow mask. The resulting image was far brighter than anything the RCA design could produce, and lacked the convergence problems that required constant adjustments. He quickly brought Morita and Ibuka to see the design, and Morita was "sold" on the spot.

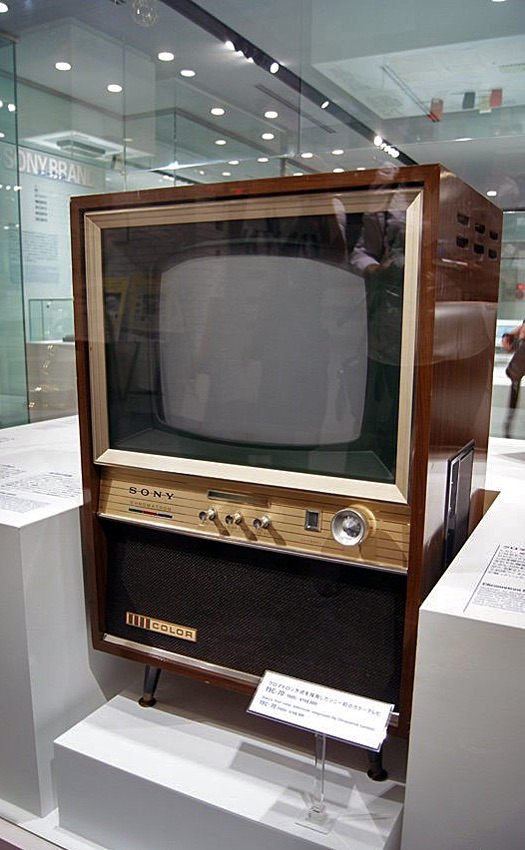
A Sony Chromatron

Morita arranged a deal with Paramount Pictures, who was paying for Chromatic Labs' development of the Chromatron, taking over the entire project. In early 1963, Senri Miyaoka was sent to Manhattan to arrange the transfer of the technology to Sony, which would lead to the closing of Chromatic Labs. He was unimpressed with the labs, describing the windowless basement as "squalor".

The American team was only too happy to point out the serious flaws in the Chromatron system, telling Miyaoka that the design was hopeless. By September 1964, a 17-inch prototype had been built in Japan, but mass-production test runs were demonstrating serious problems. Sony engineers were unable to make a version of Chromatron that could be reliably mass-produced.

When sets were finally made available in late 1964, they were put on the market at a competitive 198,000 yen (US$550), but cost the company over 400,000 yen (US$1111.11) to produce. Ibuka had bet the company on Chromatron and had already set up a new factory to produce them with the hopes that the production problems would be ironed out and the line would become profitable. After several thousand sets had shipped, the situation was no better, while Panasonic and Toshiba were in the process of introducing sets based on RCA licenses. By 1966, the Chromatron was breaking the company financially.

=== Trinitron ===
The Sony Trinitron logo used from 1992 to 2008

In the autumn of 1966, Ibuka gave in, and announced he would personally lead a search for a replacement for Chromatron. Susumu Yoshida was sent to the U.S. to look for potential licenses, and was impressed with the improvements that RCA had made in overall brightness by introducing new rare-earth phosphors on the screen. He also saw General Electric's "Porta-color" design, using three guns in a row instead of a triangle, which allowed a greater portion of the screen to be lit. His report was cause for concern in Japan, where it seemed Sony was falling ever-farther behind the U.S. designs. They might be forced to license the shadow mask system if they wanted to remain competitive.

Ibuka was not willing to give up entirely, and had his 30 engineers explore a wide variety of approaches to see if they could come up with their own design. At one point, Yoshida asked Senri Miyaoka if the in-line gun arrangement used by GE could be replaced by a single gun with three cathodes. This would be more difficult to build, but be lower cost in the long run. Miyaoka built a prototype and was astonished by how well it worked, although it had focusing problems.

Later that week, on Saturday, Miyaoka was summoned to Ibuka's office while he was attempting to leave work to attend his weekly cello practice. Yoshida had just informed Ibuka about his success, and the two asked Miyaoka if they could really develop the gun into a workable product. Miyaoka, anxious to leave, answered yes, excused himself, and left. The following Monday, Ibuka announced that Sony would be developing a new color television tube, based on Miyaoka's prototype. By February 1967, the focusing problems had been solved, and because there was a single gun, the focusing was achieved with permanent magnets instead of a coil, and required no manual adjustments after manufacturing.

During development, Sony engineer Akio Ohgoshi introduced another modification. GE's system improved on the RCA shadow mask by replacing the small round holes with slightly larger rectangles. Since the guns were in-line, their electrons would land onto three rectangular patches instead of three smaller spots, about doubling the lit area. Ohgoshi proposed removing the mask entirely and replacing it with a series of vertical slots instead, lighting the entire screen.

Although this would require the guns to be very carefully aligned with the phosphors on the tube in order to ensure they hit the right colors, with Miyaoka's new tube, this appeared possible. In practice, this proved easy to build but difficult to place in the tube – the fine wires were mechanically weak and tended to move when the tubes were bumped, resulting in shifting colors on the screen. This problem was solved by running several fine tungsten wires across the grille horizontally to keep the vertical wires of the grille in place.

The combination of three-in-one electron gun and the replacement of the shadow mask with the aperture grille resulted in an easily patentable product. In spite of Trinitron and Chromatron having no technology in common, the shared single electron gun has led to many claims that the two are similar, or the same.

=== Introduction, early models ===
The original 12-inch Trinitron (KV-1210) was officially introduced by Ibuka in April 1968. The vertical wires in the aperture grille meant that the tube had to be nearly flat vertically; this gave it a unique cylindrical look. It was also all solid state, with the exception of the picture tube itself, which allowed it to be much more compact and cool running than designs like GE's Porta-color. Some larger models such as the KV-1320UB for the United Kingdom market were initially fitted with 3AT2 valves for the extra high tension (high voltage) circuitry, before being redesigned as solid state in the early 70s.

Ibuka ended the press conference by claiming that 10,000 sets would be available by October, well beyond what engineering had told him was possible. Ibuka cajoled Yoshida to take over the effort of bringing the sets into production, and although Yoshida was furious at being put in charge of a task he felt was impossible, he finally accepted the assignment and successfully met the production goal. The KV-1210 was introduced in limited numbers in Japan in October as promised, and in the U.S. as the KV-1210U the following year.

Early color sets intended for the UK market had a PAL decoder that was different from those invented and licensed by Telefunken of Germany, who invented the PAL color system. The decoder inside the UK-sold Sony color Trinitron sets, from the KV-1300UB to the KV-1330UB, had an NTSC decoder adapted for PAL. The decoder used a 64 microsecond delay line to store every other line, but instead of using the delay line to average out the phase of the current line and the previous line, it simply repeated the same line twice. Any phase errors could then be compensated for by using a tint control knob on the front of the set, normally unneeded on a PAL set.

=== Expansion of Trinitron ===
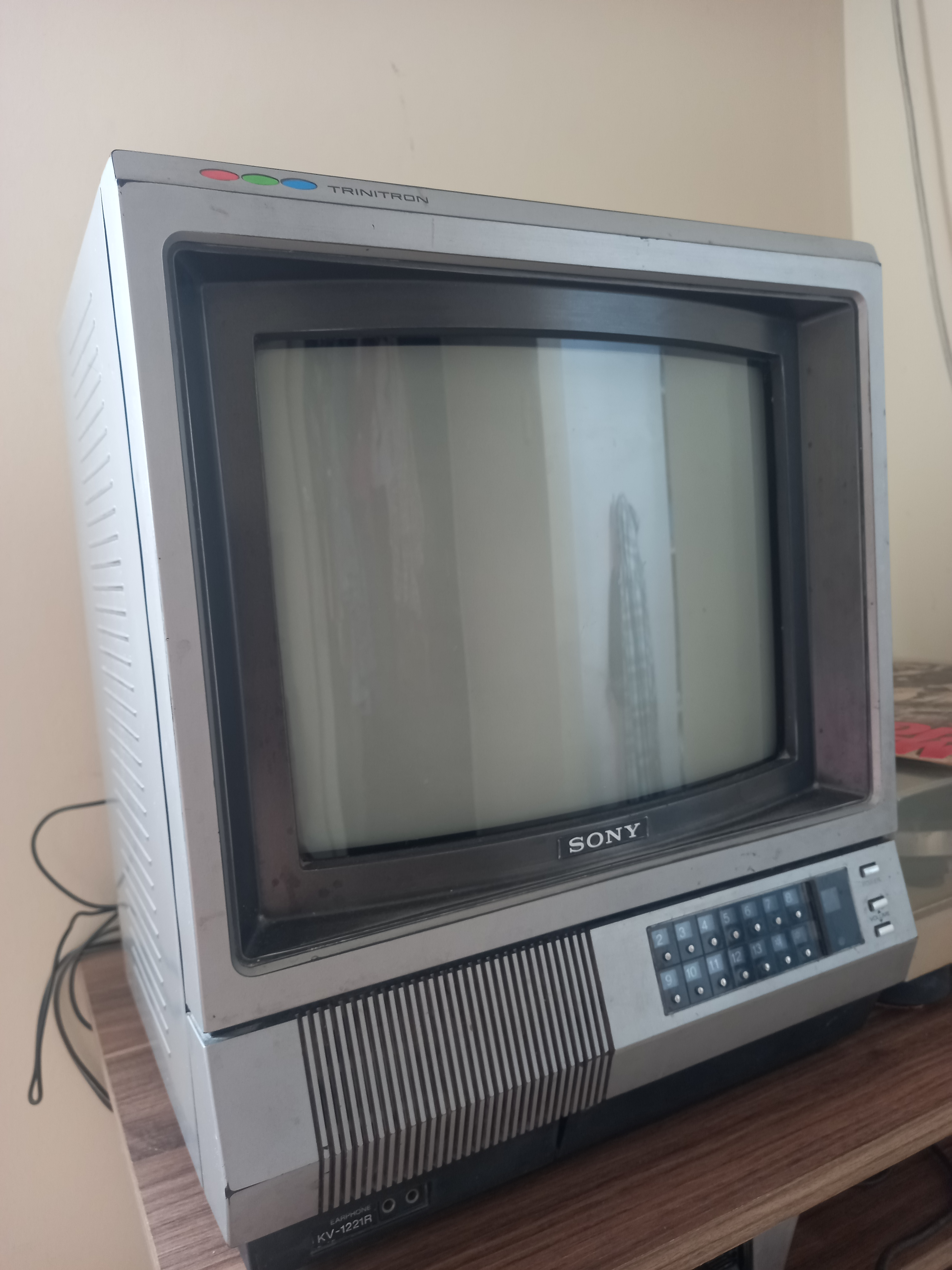
A Sony Trinitron KV-1221R television

New models quickly followed. Larger sizes at 19" and then 27" were introduced, as well as smaller, including a 7" portable. In the mid-1980s, a new phosphor coating was introduced that was much darker than earlier sets, giving the screens a black color when turned off, as opposed to the earlier light grey. This improved the contrast range of the picture. Early models were generally packaged in silver cases, but with the introduction of the darker screens, Sony also introduced new cases with a dark charcoal color, following a similar change in color taking place in the hi-fi world. This line expanded with 32", 35" and 40" units in the 1990s. In 1990, Sony released the first HD Trinitron TV set, for use with the Multiple sub-Nyquist sampling encoding standard.

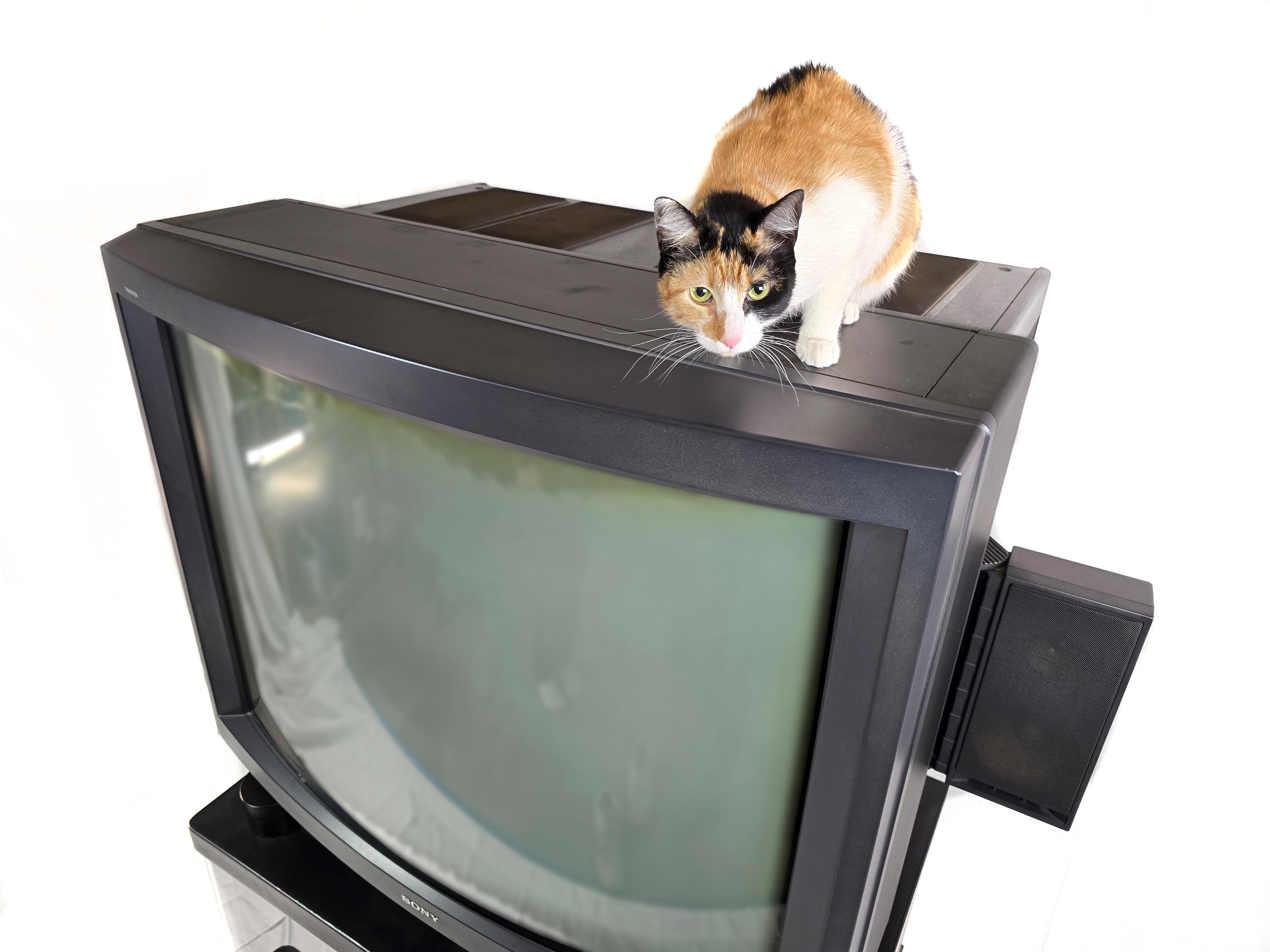
A Sony Trinitron PVM-4300, the largest CRT display ever produced

In 1980, Sony introduced the "ProFeel" line of prosumer component televisions, consisting of a range of Trinitron monitors that could be connected to standardized tuners. The original lineup consisted of the KX-20xx1 20" and KX-27xx1 27" monitors (the "xx" is an identifier, PS for Europe, HF for Japan, etc.) the VTX-100ES tuner and TXT-100G TeleText decoder. They were often used with a set of SS-X1A stereo speakers, which matched the grey boxy styling of the suite. The concept was to build a market similar to contemporary stereo equipment, where components from different vendors could be mixed to produce a complete system.

A lack of any major third party components, along with custom connectors between the tuner and monitors, meant that systems mixing fully compatible elements were never effectively realized. They were popular high-end units, and found a strong following in production companies where the excellent quality picture made them effective low-cost monitors. A second series of all-black units followed in 1986, the ProFeel Pro, sporting a space-frame around the back of the trapezoidal enclosure that doubled as a carrying handle and holder for the pop-out speakers. These units were paired with the VT-X5R tuner and optionally the APM-X5A speakers.

Α Sony Trinitron KV-X2131D television, manufactured in the early 1990s.

Sony also produced lines of Trinitron professional studio monitors, the PVM (Professional Video Monitor) and BVM (Broadcast Video Monitor) lines. These models were packaged in grey metal cubes with a variety of inputs that accepted practically any analog format. They originally used tubes similar to the ProFeel line, but over time, they gradually increased in resolution until the late 1990s when they offered over 900 lines. When these were cancelled as part of the wider Trinitron shutdown in 2007, professionals forced Sony to re-open two of the lines to produce the 20 and 14 inch models.

Among similar products, Sony produced the KV-1311 monitor/TV combination. It accepted NTSC-compatible video from various devices as well as analog broadcast TV. Along with its other functions, it had video and audio inputs and outputs as well as a wideband sound-IF decoded output. Its exterior looks much like the monitor illustrated here, with added TV controls.

By this time, Sony was well established as a supplier of reliable equipment; it was preferable to have minimal field failures instead of supporting an extensive service network for the entire United States.

Sony started developing the Trinitron for computer monitor use in the late 1970s. Demand was high, so high that there were examples of third party companies removing Trinitron tubes from televisions to use as monitors. In response, Sony started development of the GDM (Graphic Display Monitor) in 1983, which offered high resolution and faster refresh rates. Sony aggressively promoted the GDM and it became a standard on high-end monitors by the late 1980s.

Particularly common models include the Apple Inc. 13" model that was originally sold with the Macintosh II starting in 1987. Well known users also included Digital Equipment Corporation, IBM, Silicon Graphics, Sun Microsystems and others. Demand for a lower cost solution led to the CDP series. In May 1988, the high-end 20 inch DDM model (Data Display Monitor) was introduced with a maximum resolution of 2,048 by 2,048, which went on to be used in the FAA's Advanced Automation System air traffic control system.

These developments meant that Sony was well placed to introduce high-definition televisions (HDTV). In April 1981, they announced the High Definition Video System (HDVS), a suite of MUSE equipment including cameras, recorders, Trinitron monitors and projection TVs.

Sony shipped its 100 millionth Trinitron screen in July 1994, 25 years after it had been introduced. New uses in the computer field and the demand for higher resolution televisions to match the quality of DVD when it was introduced in 1996 led to increased sales, with another 180 million units delivered in the next decade.

=== End of Trinitron ===
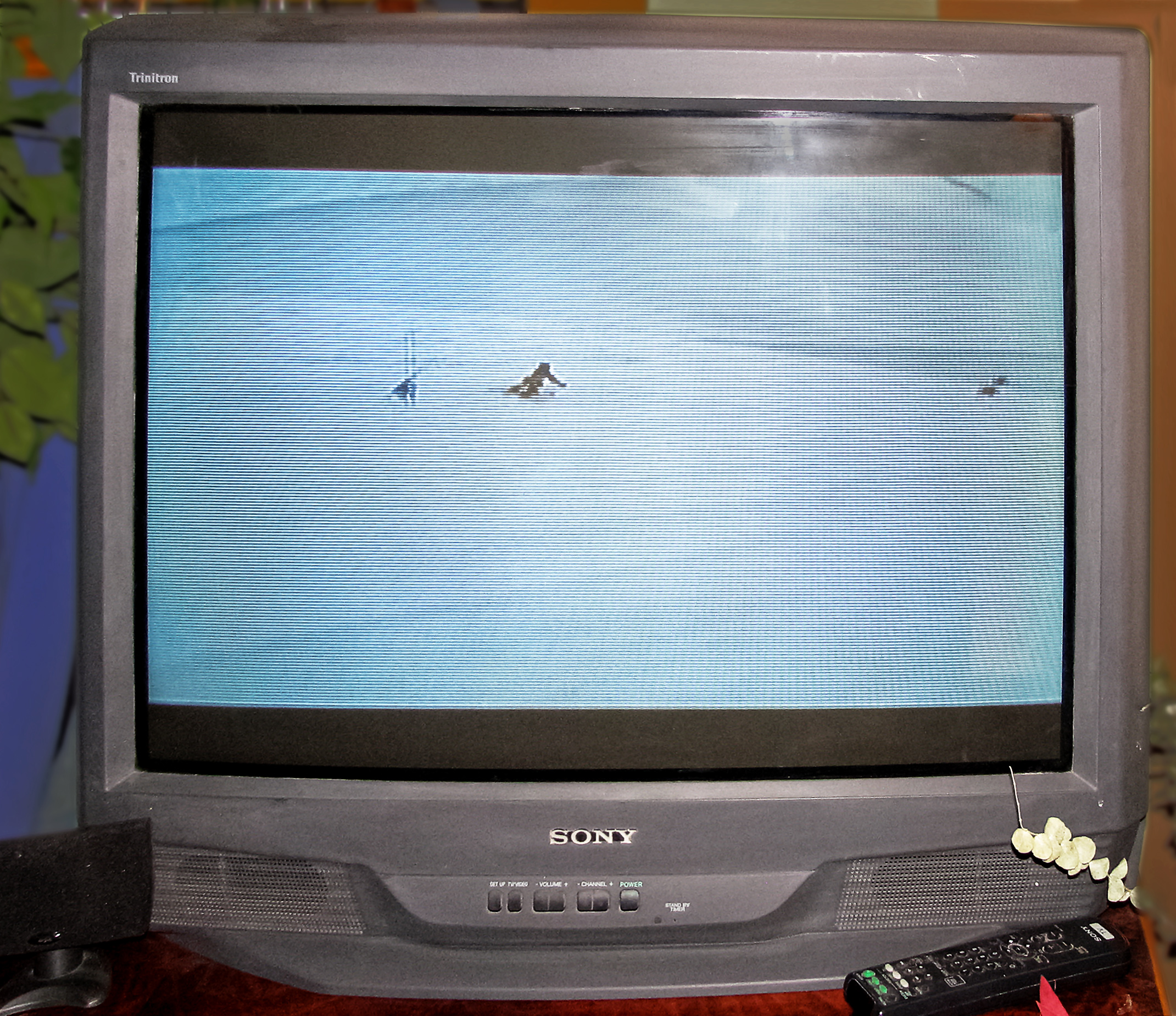
A Sony KV-32S42, a typical late-model Trinitron television, manufactured in 2001

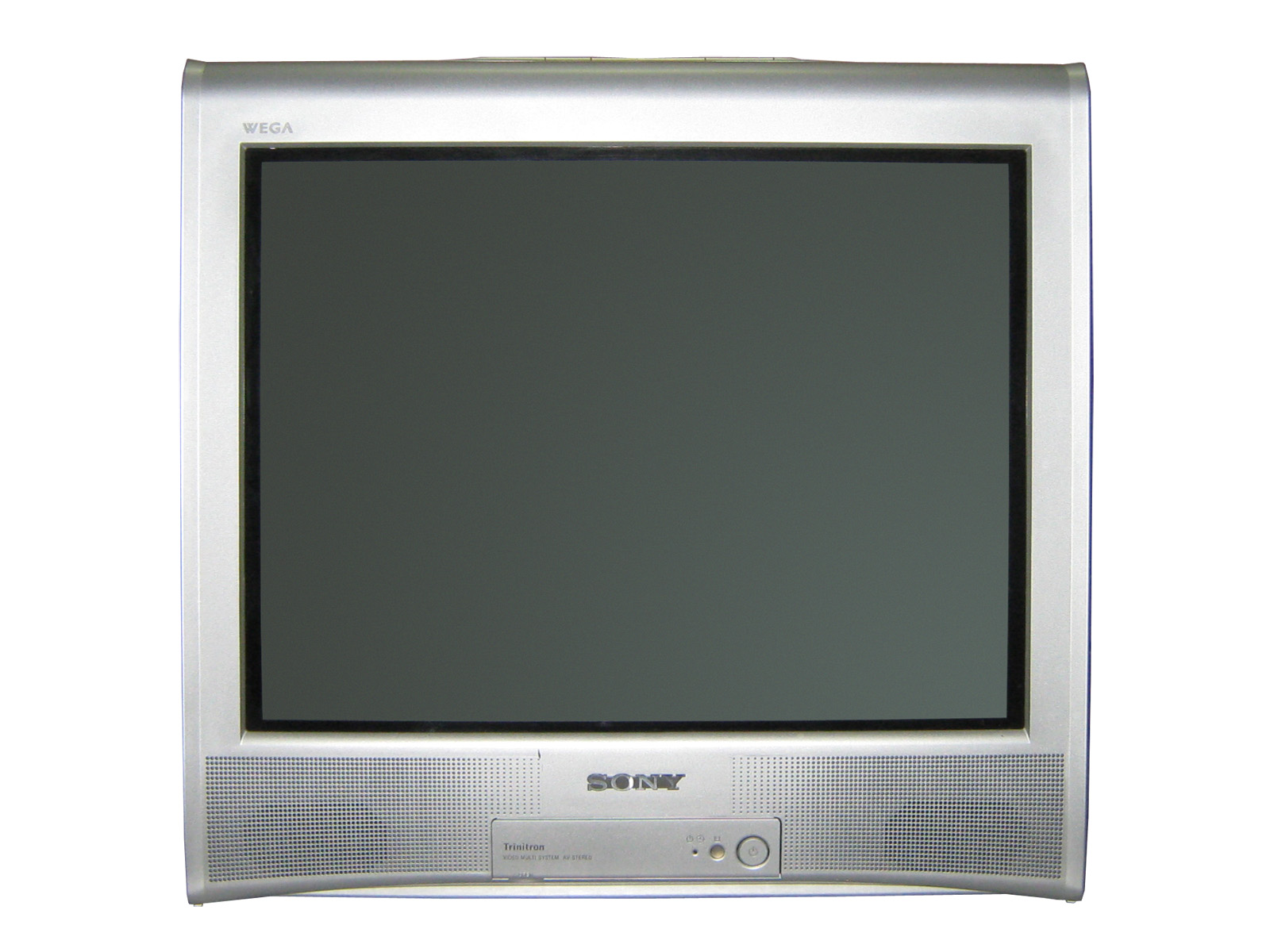
A Sony FD Trinitron flat-screen CRT

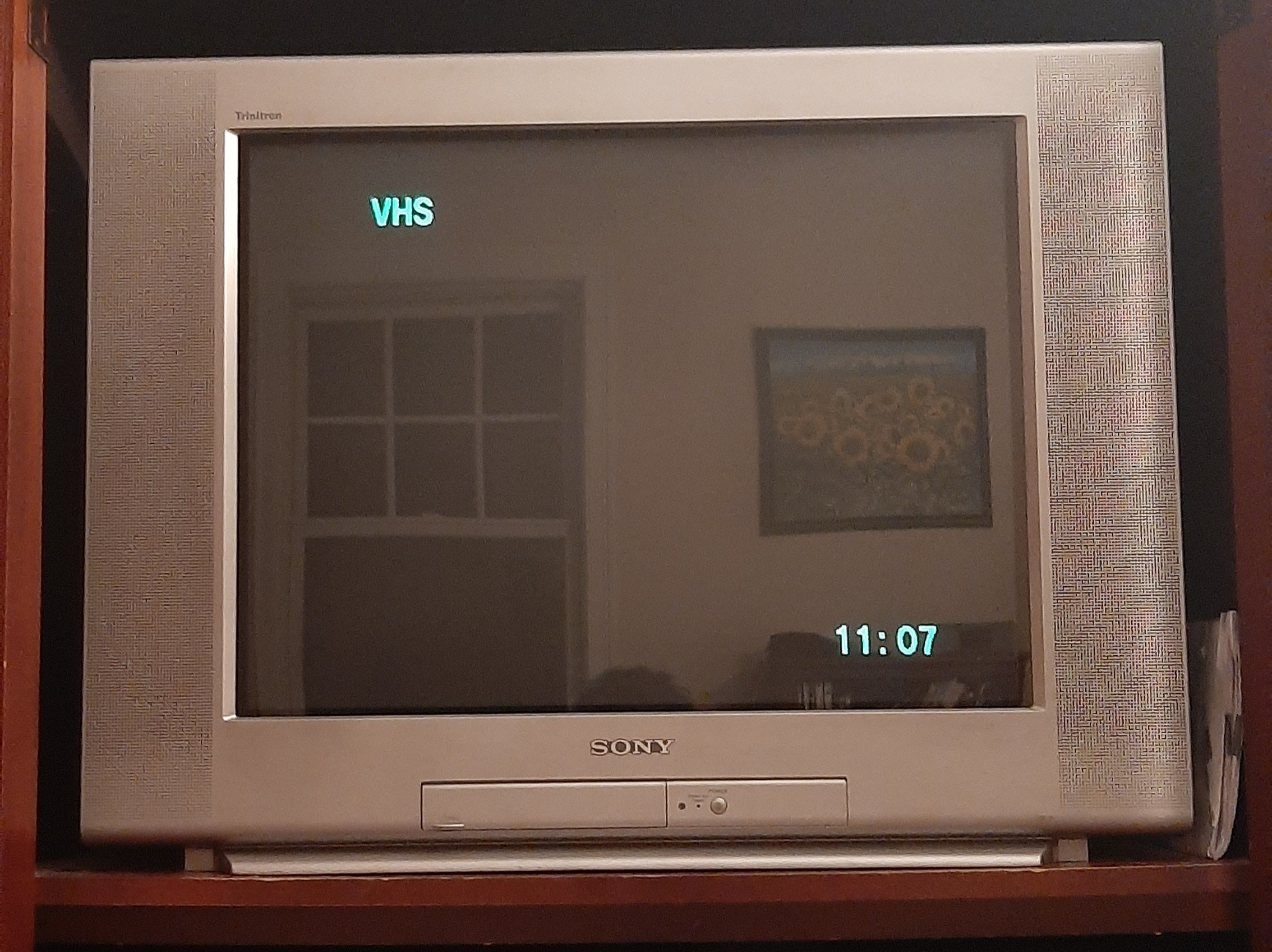
A Sony Trinitron KV-27FS100, an example of an FD Trinitron model with a more boxy appearance

Sony's patent on the Trinitron display ran out in 1996, after 20 years. After the expiration of Sony's Trinitron patent, manufacturers like Mitsubishi (whose monitor production is now part of NEC Display Solutions) were free to use the Trinitron design for their own product line without license from Sony, although they could not use the Trinitron name. For example, Mitsubishi's are called Diamondtron. To some degree, the name Trinitron became a generic term referring to any similar set.

Sony responded with the FD Trinitron, which used computer-controlled feedback systems to ensure sharp focus across a flat screen. Initially introduced on their 27, 32 and 36 inch models in 1998, the new tubes were offered in a variety of resolutions for different uses. The basic WEGA models supported normal 480i signals, but a larger version offered 16:9 aspect ratios. The technology was quickly applied to the entire Trinitron range, from 13 to 36 inch. High resolution versions, Hi-Scan and Super Fine Pitch, were also produced. With the introduction of the FD Trinitron, Sony also introduced a new industrial style, leaving the charcoal colored sets introduced in the 1980s for a new silver styling.

Sony was not the only company producing flat screen CRTs. Other companies had already introduced high-end brands with flat-screen tubes, like Panasonic's Tau. Many other companies entered the market quickly, widely copying the new silver styling as well. The FD Trinitron was unable to regain the cachet that the Trinitron brand had previously possessed; in the 2004 Christmas season, they increased sales by 5%, but only at the cost of a 75% plunge in profits after being forced to lower costs to compete in the market.

At the same time, the introduction of plasma televisions, and then LCD-based ones, led to the high-end market being increasingly focused on the "thin" sets. Both of these technologies have well known problems, and for some time Sony explored a wide array of technologies that would improve upon them in the same way the Trinitron did on the shadow mask. Among these experiments were organic light-emitting diodes (OLED) and the field-emission display, but in spite of considerable effort, neither of these technologies matured into competitors at the time. Sony also introduced their Plasmatron displays, and later LCD as well, but these had no inherent technical advantages over similar sets from other companies. From 2006, all of Sony's BRAVIA television products are LCD displays, initially based on screens from Samsung, and later Sharp.

Sony eventually ended production of the Trinitron in Japan in 2004. In 2006, Sony announced that it would no longer market or sell Trinitrons in the United States or Canada, but it continued to sell the Trinitron in China, India, and regions of South America using tubes delivered from their Singapore plant. Production in Singapore ended in late March 2008, only months after ending production of their rear-projection systems.

280 million Trinitron tubes were built. At its peak, 20 million were made annually.

== Reception ==
Reviews of the Trinitron were universally positive, although they all mentioned its high cost. Sony won an Emmy Award for the Trinitron in 1973. On his 84th birthday in 1992, Ibuka claimed the Trinitron was his proudest product.

== Description ==
=== Basic concept ===
The Trinitron design incorporates two unique features: the single-gun three-cathode picture tube, and the vertically aligned aperture grille.

The single gun consists of a long-necked tube with a single electrode at its base, flaring out into a horizontally-aligned rectangular shape with three rectangular cathodes inside. Each cathode is fed the amplified signal from one of the decoded RGB signals.

The electrons from the cathodes are all aimed toward a single point at the back of the screen where they hit the aperture grille, a steel sheet with vertical slots cut in it. Due to the slight separation of the cathodes at the back of the tube, the three beams approach the grille at slightly different angles. When they pass through the grille they retain this angle, hitting their individual colored phosphors that are deposited in vertical stripes on the inside of the faceplate.

The main purpose of the grille is to ensure that each beam strikes only the phosphor stripes for its color, much as does a shadow mask. Unlike a shadow mask, there are essentially no obstructions along each entire phosphor stripe. Larger CRTs have a few horizontal stabilizing wires part way between top and bottom.

=== Advantages ===
In comparison to early shadow mask designs, the Trinitron grille cuts off much less of the signal coming from the electron guns. RCA tubes built in the 1950s cut off about 85% of the electron beam, while the grille cuts off about 25%. Improvements to the shadow mask designs continually narrowed this difference between the two designs, and by the late 1980s the difference in performance, at least theoretically, was eliminated.

Another advantage of the aperture grille was that the distance between the wires remained constant vertically across the screen. In the shadow mask design, the size of the holes in the mask is defined by the required resolution of the phosphor dots on the screen, which was constant. The distance from the guns to the holes changed; for dots near the center of the screen, the distance was its shortest, at points in the corners it was at its maximum.

To ensure that the guns were focused on the holes, a system known as dynamic convergence had to constantly adjust the focus point as the beam moved across the screen. In the Trinitron design, the problem was greatly simplified, requiring changes only for large screen sizes, and only on a line-by-line basis.

For this reason, Trinitron systems are easier to focus than shadow masks, and generally had a sharper image. This was a major selling point of the Trinitron design for much of its history. In the 1990s, new computer-controlled real-time feedback focusing systems eliminated this advantage, as well as leading to the introduction of "true flat" designs.

=== Disadvantages ===
==== Visible support or damping wires ====
Even small changes in the alignment of the grille over the phosphors can cause the color purity to shift. Since the wires are thin, small bumps can cause the wires to shift alignment if they are not held in place. Monitors using Trinitron technology have one or more thin tungsten wires running horizontally across the grille to prevent this. Screens 15" and below have one wire located about two thirds of the way down the screen, while monitors greater than 15" have 2 wires at the one-third and two-thirds positions.

These wires are less apparent or completely obscured on standard definition sets due to wider scan lines to match the lower resolution of the video being displayed. On computer monitors, where the scan lines are much closer together, the wires are often visible. This is a minor drawback of the Trinitron standard which is not shared by shadow mask CRTs. Aperture grilles are not as mechanically stable as shadow or slot masks. A tap can cause the image to briefly become distorted, even with damping/support wires. Some people may find the wires to be distracting.

==== Anti-glare coating ====
A polyurethane sheet coated to scatter reflections is affixed to the front of the screen, where it can be damaged.

== Partial list of other aperture grille brands ==
- Sharp NEC Display Solutions (NEC/Mitsubishi) "Diamondtron"
- Gateway, Inc. "Vivitron" (Trinitron and Diamondtron rebrand)
- MAG InnoVision "Technitron" (Trinitron rebrand)
- ViewSonic "SonicTron" (Trinitron rebrand)

== See also ==
- History of television
