= WEGA =

German audio and video manufacturer

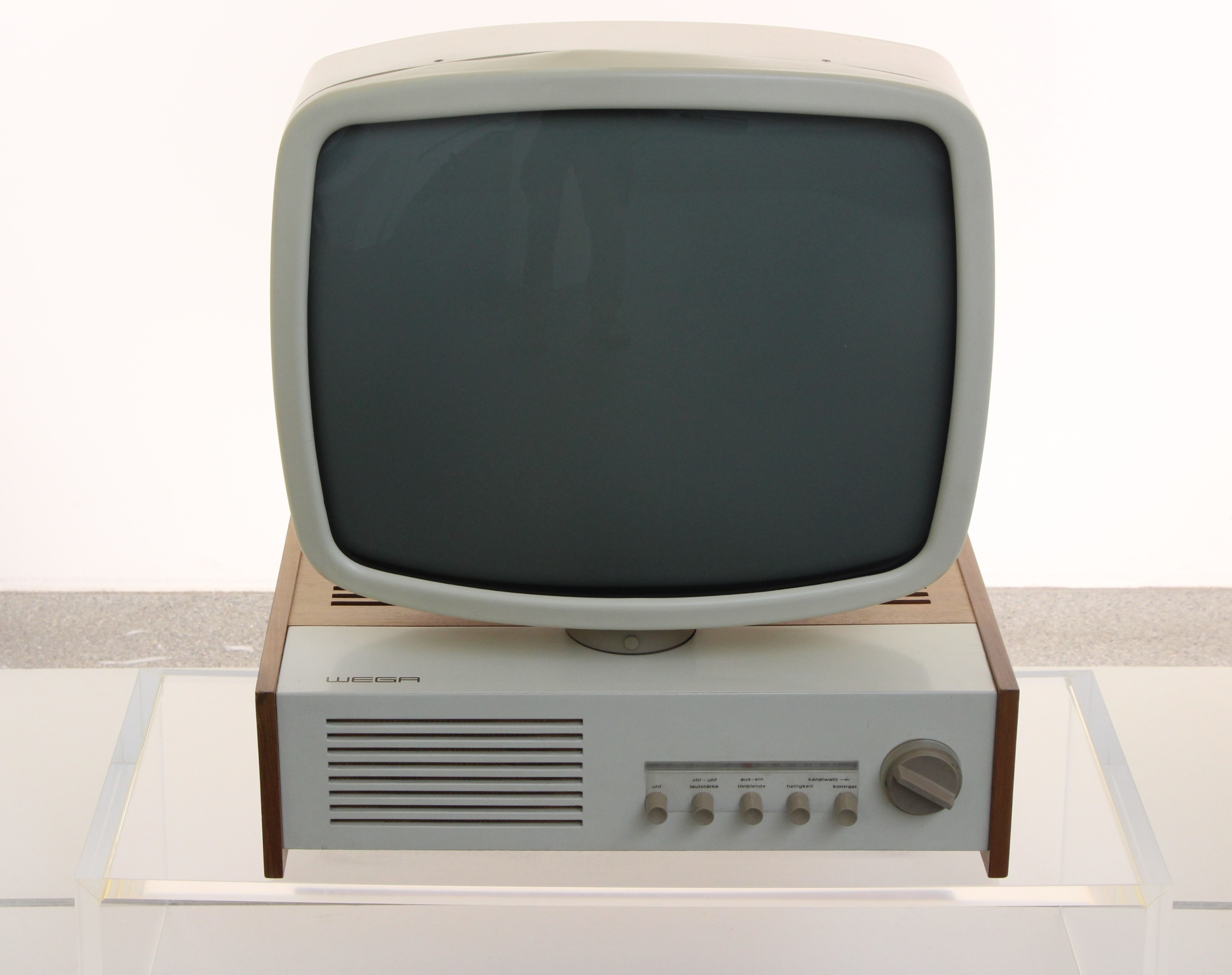
Wegavision 2000, TV-prototype 1962, Pinakothek der Moderne

WEGA (pronounced "Vega") is a brand name of consumer electronics that was originally created and used by Wega Radio GmbH of Stuttgart, Germany. After being acquired by Sony Corporation, the Japanese manufacturer adopted the WEGA name globally for a series of televisions from 1997 until 2005.

== Wega company ==
Wega was founded as Wuerttembergische Radio-Gesellschaft mbh in Stuttgart, Germany, in 1923. It was a German audio and video manufacturer that manufactured some of Germany's earliest radio receivers.

In 1975, it was acquired by Sony Corporation. They were then known throughout Europe for stylish and high-quality stereo equipment, designed by Verner Panton and Hartmut Esslinger. In 1980, Sony used half of the production in Stuttgart for its Trinitron televisions.

The quality of the design by Esslinger was highly appreciated, to the extent that the Museum of Modern Art in New York exhibits one example, the Concept 51k sound system from 1976, for which a special stand was an available option.

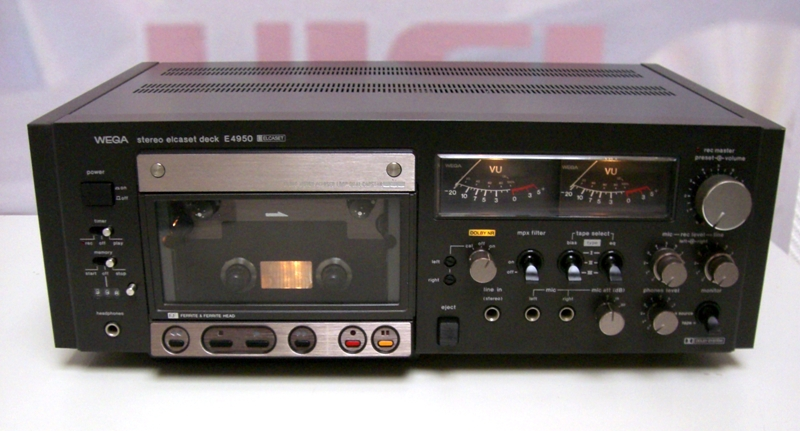
Wega tapedeck for Sony Elcaset, 1976–1980

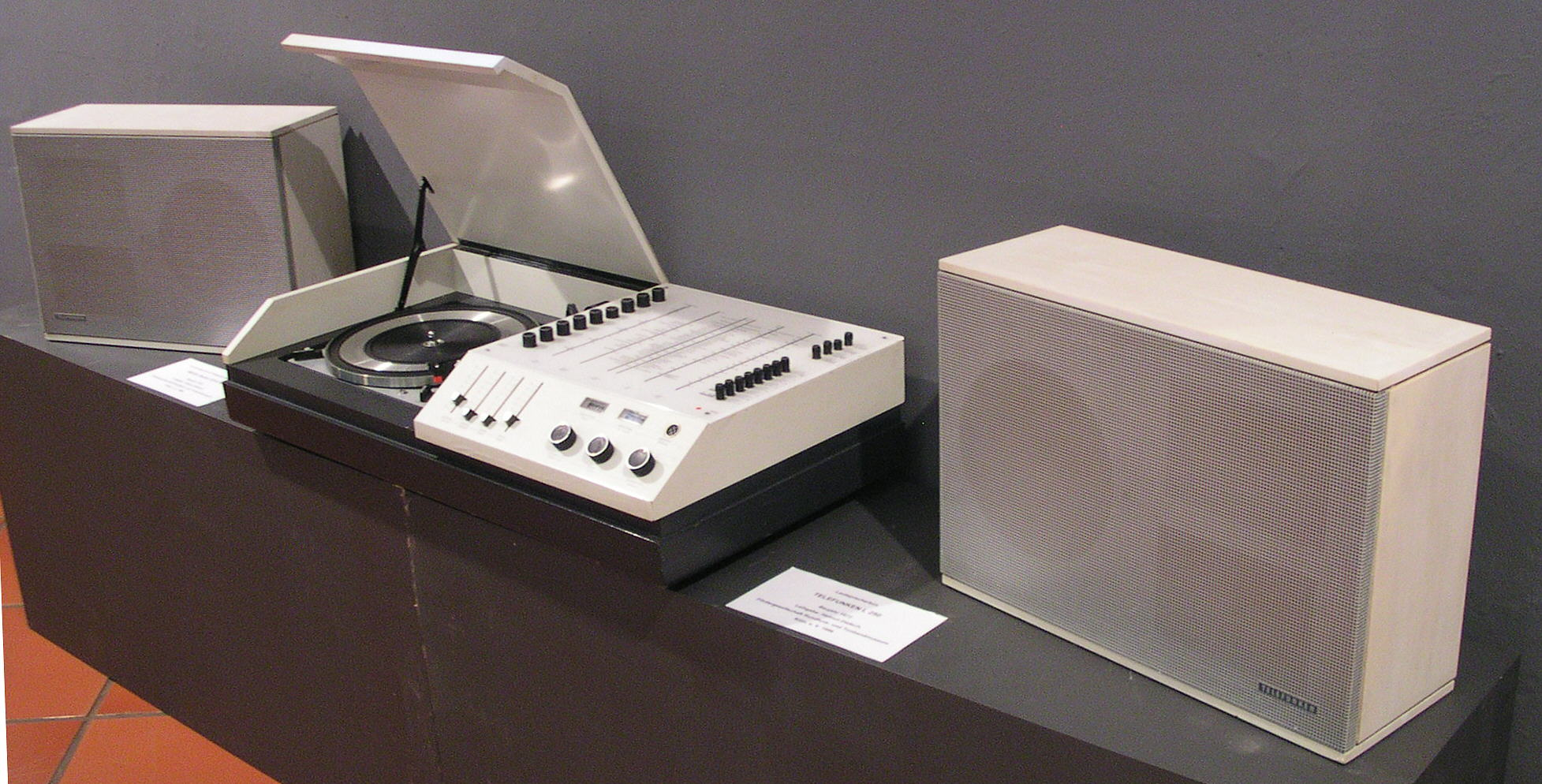
WEGA Studio 3214 HiFi with record player, Dual 1218, and loudspeakers Telefunken L 250, 1972

== Sony television brand ==

When Sony developed their flat-screen FD Trinitron picture tube, they decided to market it under a fresh new name and chose the WEGA trademark as the sole brand in both Japan and the Americas whereas in regions like Germany it remained in use for certain products in the range. Sony said that the FD Trinitron WEGA was named after a star ("Vega" in English) in the Lyra constellation, and made no reference to the original WEGA firm. The product, released in 1997 in Japan and 1998 in other regions, with its side-mounted speakers and a silver-coloured cabinet, was successful and drove the tube TV industry into flat displays.

Logo of Grand WEGA

Sony then also used WEGA as a name for televisions with newer technologies than traditional CRT, starting in 2001 with the Grand WEGA line of rear-projection televisions, either Silicon X-tal Reflective Display (SXRD) or LCD-based, the Plasma WEGA line of flat-panel plasma (PDP) televisions and Sony's first plasma screen, and the LCD WEGA line of flat-panel LCD televisions in 2002. In late 2002, Sony also rolled out the WEGA Engine, a proprietary digital processing system designed to improve picture quality on LCD and PDP flat-panels to match CRTs.

Sony continued to use the WEGA brand for these until 2005, when liquid-crystal displays superseded the company's Trinitron aperture grille-based CRT models. Sony introduced the all new BRAVIA brand for future LCD televisions, superseding WEGA.

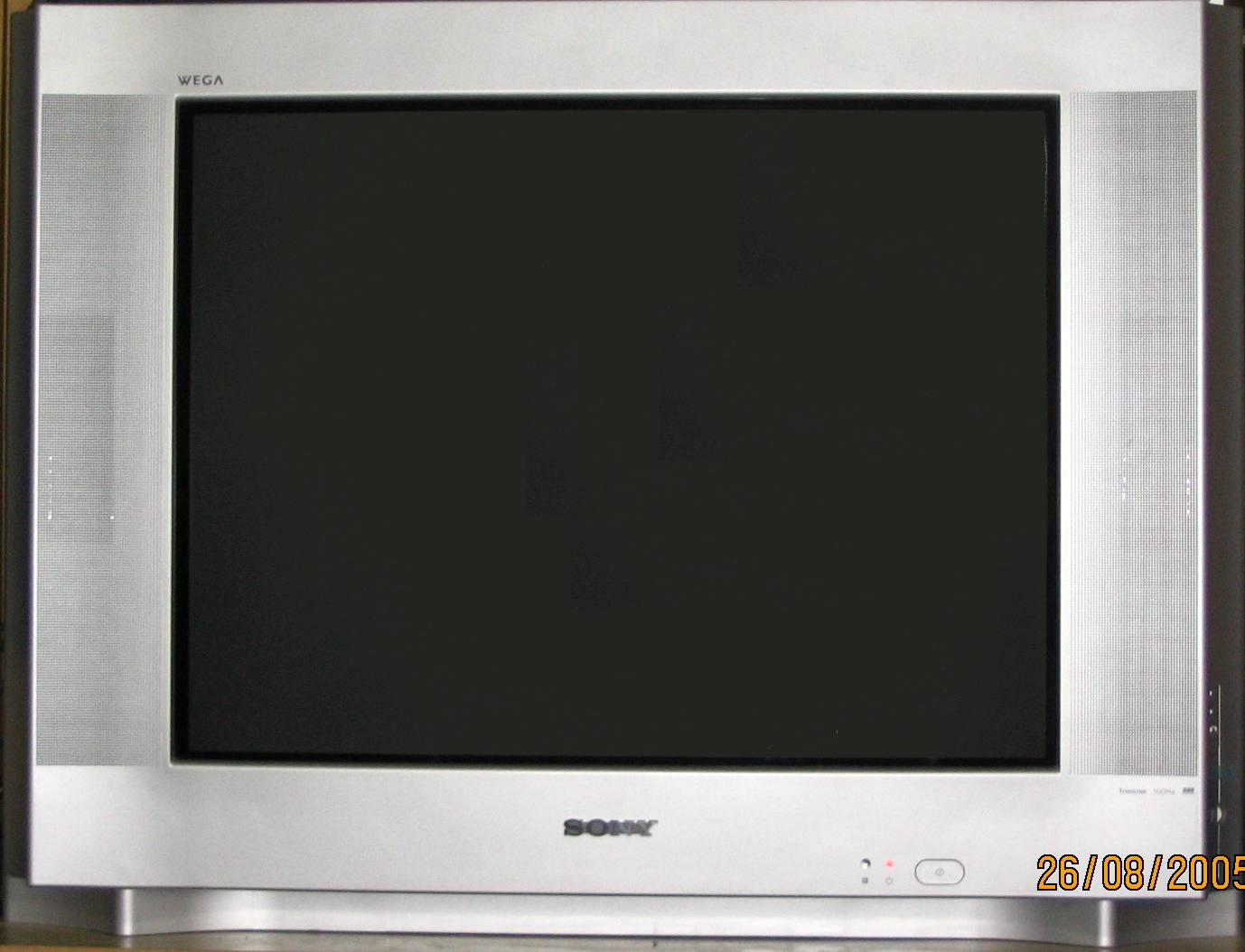
WEGA-branded flat-screen Trinitron grille CRT TV, c. 2002

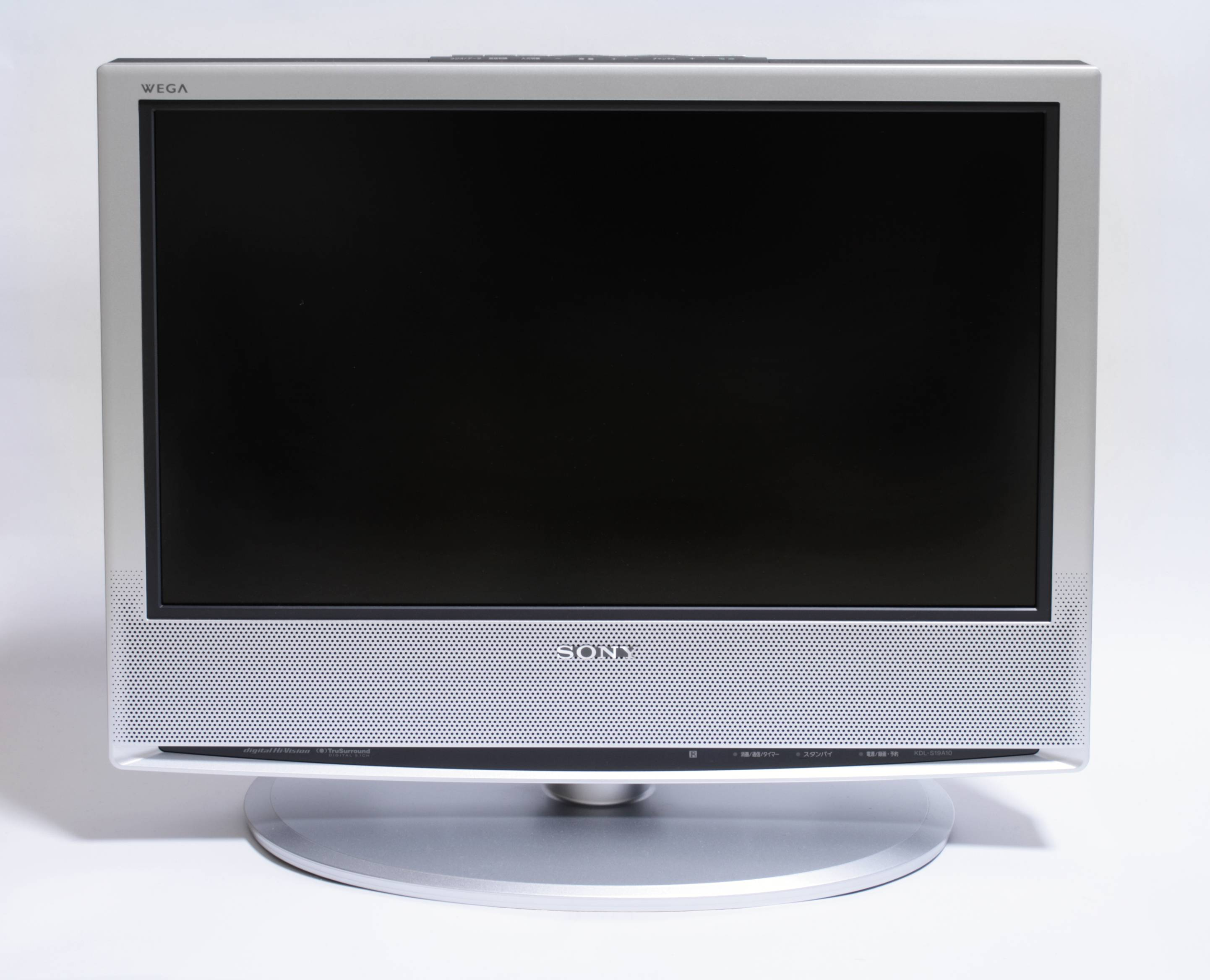
WEGA-branded LCD TV, c. 2005

== See also ==
- Braun – German consumer products company
- Brionvega – Italian electronics company
