= Sony Technology Center =

Former American television manufacturing plant

- Operated: 1972–2006
- Location: 16450 West Bernardo Drive; San Diego, California, United States
- Industry: Electronics
- Products: Televisions picture tubes computer monitors
- Employees: 3,100 (2001)
- Owner: Sony Corporation of America

Sony Technology Center, also known as STC, was a manufacturing complex owned by Sony, and was located in Rancho Bernardo, San Diego, California, United States. It was Sony's first manufacturing plant in the United States since the plant was established in 1972.

== History ==
=== Early history ===
On December 14, 1971, Sony began constructing its first U.S. television manufacturing plant in the Rancho Bernardo section of San Diego, California. The plant was opened on August 3, 1972, with approximately 35 employees working on a single production line to produce the KV-1720 model.

In 1973, the plant was assembling 17-inch and 19-inch Trinitron color televisions, producing approximately 7,000 to 20,000 sets per month. Sony announced in March 1973 that it will build a 166,000-square-foot Trinitron picture tube manufacturing plant adjacent to their existing color TV plant.

In June 1974, Sony commenced manufacturing color picture tubes (CRT) at a new facility in the same area, 30,000 Trinitron color picture tubes per month, becoming the first integrated color TV production facility established by a Japanese company overseas.

In 1981, the plant was employing 1,800 people and was producing around 750,000 Trinitron television sets annually. Two years later, the plant has a mix of Japanese and American management practices, often referred to as "the San Diego way".

In April 1985, Sony announced that it would begin importing color television picture tubes from its manufacturing plant in San Diego, California, back to Japan. Also, they established another television manufacturing plant in Tijuana, Mexico, in October 1985, named "Sony Baja California", starting operations in March 1986.

=== Late 20th-century expansion ===
In 1987, Sony was expanding its manufacturing operations the San Diego-Tijuana area; it includes expanding the 38-acre Rancho Bernardo facility, plus opening a new 300,000-square-foot plant in Tijuana for 13-inch TV assembly.

In April 1988, Sony announced that it will add 3.5-inch floppy disk drive production at its manufacturing plant in Rancho Bernardo. Later, Sony announced in June of the year that it will buy a 32-acre parcel of land in the area, doubling its existing 750,000-square-foot television manufacturing plant, which employed approximately 1,500 people in the same year.

On January 26, 1989, Sony announced a $10 million, 150,000-square-foot expansion of the 750,000-square-foot facility to produce high-resolution computer display monitors. Later on November 3, 1989, Sony announced a $100 million investment to expand the San Diego plant to begin manufacturing 32-inch color television sets by the following summer.

In August 1995, Sony opened a new $50 million factory at its Rancho Bernardo facility for production of color picture tubes for computer monitors. Sony announced in August 1997 that a $60 million expansion of its "Sony Technology Center" in San Diego, which was expected to add over 450 jobs to a workforce of 4,000.

=== Decline and closure ===
In January 2001, Sony announced it would lay off about 500 employees at the Rancho Bernardo facility, representing roughly 15 percent of its local workforce at the time, as it closed down two computer display picture tube production lines. Despite the layoffs, about 3,100 workers retained jobs across 20 divisions at the site in early 2001.

In February 2004, Sony Electronics officially announced it was moving its U.S. headquarters from Park Ridge, New Jersey, to its existing 1,800,000-square-foot manufacturing plant in Rancho Bernardo, San Diego, California.

In January 2006, Sony Electronics announced that it will close the television picture-tube (CRT) manufacturing plant in Rancho Bernardo, San Diego, by June 2006, laying off approximately 400 employees.
