= History of Sony =

The history of Sony, a Japanese multinational conglomerate, dates back to 1946.

== Founding ==
In September 1945, after the end of World War II, Masaru Ibuka started a radio repair shop in the bomb-damaged Shirokiya department store building in the Nihonbashi district of Tokyo. The next year, he was joined by his wartime research colleague, Akio Morita, and on 7 May 1946, they founded a company called Tokyo Tsushin Kogyo K.K. (Tokyo Telecommunications Engineering Corporation). The company produced Japan's first tape recorder, called the Type-G.

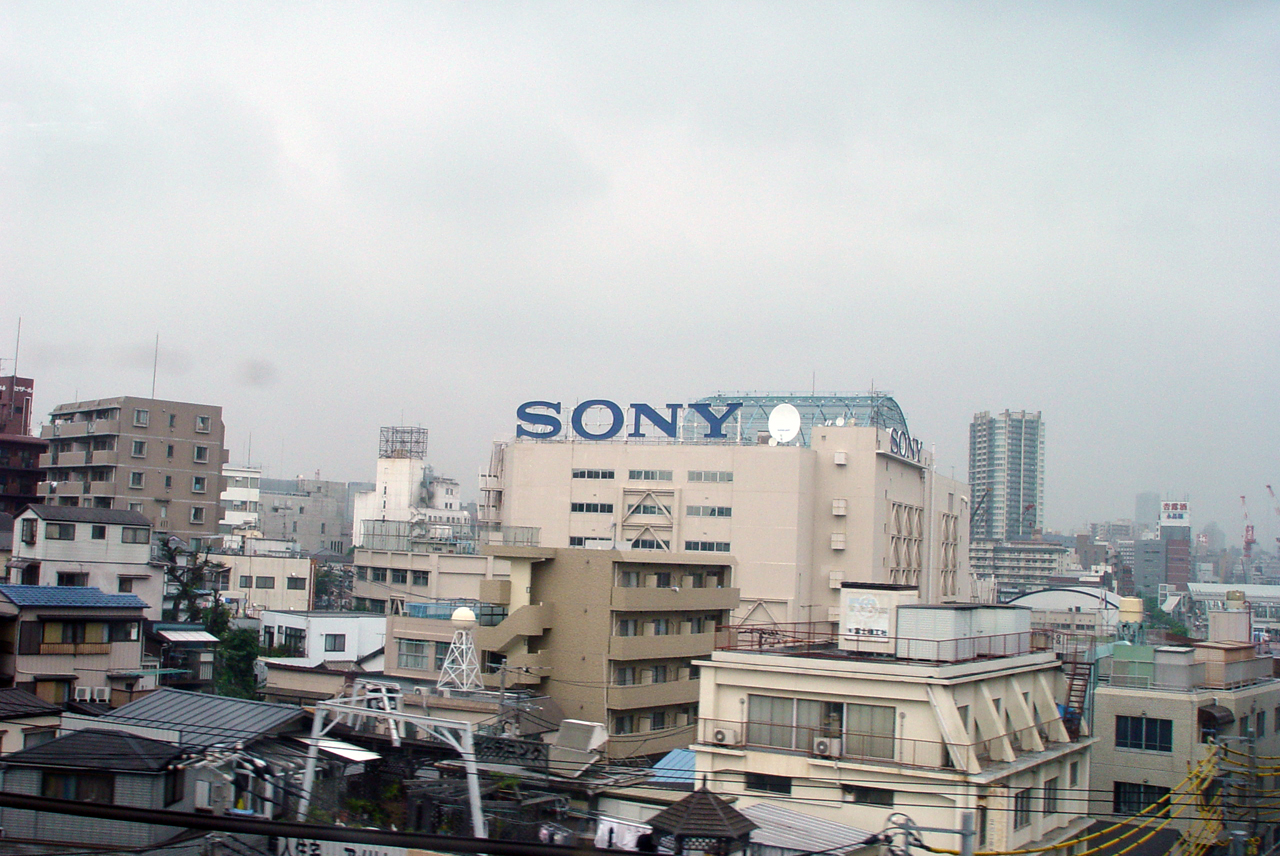
Sony Osaki West Technology Center (formerly Osaki Plant) in Ōsaki, Shinagawa, Tokyo was the major R&D and manufacturing facility for its Trinitron television sets, closed in 2007 (pictured in 2005)

In the early 1950s, Ibuka traveled to the United States, looking for a market for the company's tape recorder, and heard about Bell Labs' invention of the transistor. He convinced Bell to license the transistor technology to his Japanese company. Bell Labs agreed to do so while recommending Ibuka to produce Hearing aids using the transistor, then a popular application for the technology, suggesting that it would be difficult to apply the technology to radio. While most Japanese companies were researching the transistor for its military applications, Ibuka and Morita looked to apply it to communications.

Although the American companies Regency Electronics and Texas Instruments built the first transistor radio as joint venture in 1954, it would be the Ibuka's company that made them commercially successful for the first time.

== As an innovator ==
In August 1955, Tokyo Tsushin Kogyo released the Sony TR-55, Japan's first commercially produced transistor radio. They followed up in December of the same year by releasing the TR-72, a product that won favor both within Japan and in export markets, including Canada, Australia, the Netherlands and Germany. Featuring six transistors, push-pull output and greatly improved sound quality, the TR-72 continued to be a popular seller into the early sixties.

In May 1956, the company released the TR-6, which featured an innovative slim design and sound quality capable of rivaling portable tube radios. The following year, 1957, Tokyo Tsushin Kogyo came out with the TR-63 model, then the smallest (112 × 71 × 32 mm) transistor radio in commercial production. It was a worldwide commercial success. The company marketed the radio as "pocketable", a Japanese-style English word the company came up with to highlight its portability and pocket-size. The word soon featured in English dictionary.

University of Arizona professor Michael Brian Schiffer, PhD, says, "Sony was not first, but its transistor radio was the most successful. The TR-63 of 1957 cracked open the U.S. market and launched the new industry of consumer microelectronics." By the mid-1950s, American teens had begun buying portable transistor radios in huge numbers, helping to propel the fledgling industry from an estimated 100,000 units in 1955 to 5,000,000 units by the end of 1968. As a result of the popularity of transistor radios, which empowered privacy and individualism, the way people listen to radio or music has changed forever. Sony also launched the world's first integrated circuit radio, the ICR-100 in 1967.

Following the first success in American consumer market, Tokyo Tsushin Kogyo changed its name to Sony in 1958 as people outside Japan struggled to pronounce the original name. Sony established Sony Corporation of America, the company's first subsidiary in America, in 1960. And in the same year, Sony made another innovation by releasing the world's first non-projection type all-transistor and portable television, Sony TV8-301.

In 1961, Sony launched the world's first compact transistor VTR, the PV-100. In 1968, Sony launched the legendary color television set, Trinitron. The Trinitron was the reason that Sony had been the world's largest TV manufacturer in terms of annual revenue until 2006.

In 1969, Sony launched Sony TC-50, a compact cassette recorder. NASA equipped every astronaut with the device from Apollo 7 onwards. Astronauts were required to use the recorder to log their missions but they also listened to music by inserting and playing the pre-recorded tapes. Masaru Ibuka also enjoyed listening to classical music using recorders, preluding the birth of Walkman. In October the same year, Sony released a prototype of the world's first commercial videocassette recorder. This led to the official launch of the VP-1100 two years later.

Sony received the Emmy in 1973 for developing the Trinitron. This was the first Emmy awarded to an electronics. In 1975, Sony launched the Betamax, which took part and lost in the video format war.

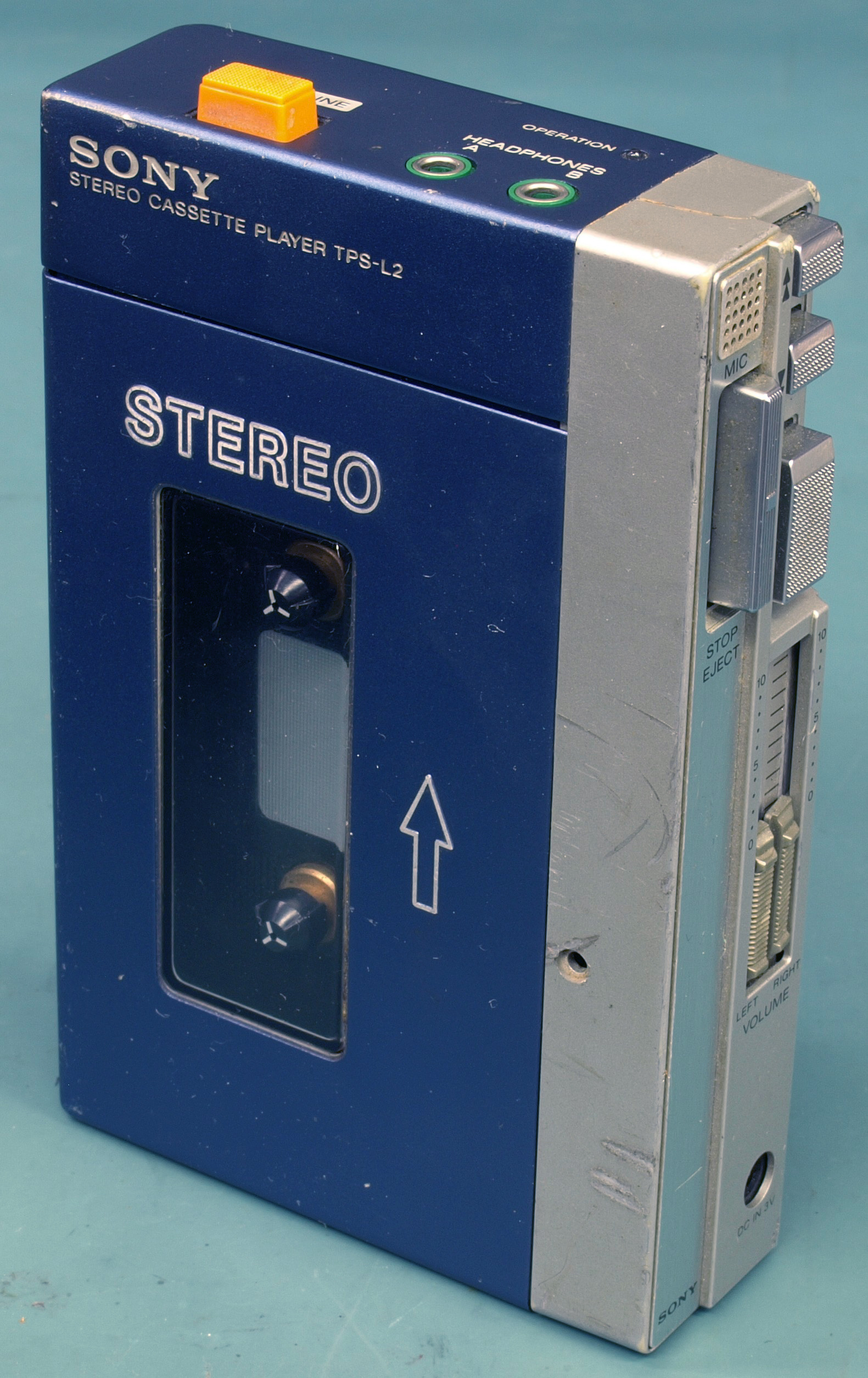
The original Walkman TPS-L2 released in 1979

Walkman, the first stereo cassette player, was launched in 1979. The year 1981 is considered as a starting point of the Digital Revolution with Sony launching the world's first Compact Disc player, the Sony CDP-101, with a Compact Disc (CD) itself, a new data storage format Sony and Philips co-developed. In that year, a 3.5-inch floppy disk structure was introduced by Sony and it soon became the de facto standard.

Sony is also the company that produced the first color video camera using a CCD, the XC-1. The Sony Mavica, released in 1981, is a prototype of the world's first commercial electronic still camera.

Sony played a significant role in the tech industry in the second half of the 20th century alongside Hewlett-Packard and IBM. Steve Jobs, fascinated by the company's innovative products, culture and work environment, was a big fan of Sony and regarded the company being in a league of their own, apart from the other comparable competitors.

In 1991, Sony released the first c ommercial lithium-ion battery jointly with Asahi Kasei and had been the leader in the rechargeable battery industry until a massive defective battery scandal occurred in 2006.

Sony introduced Memory Stick, a flash memory storage format, in 1998, a year earlier than the announcement of SD card. The Sony's format is considered as a yet another failed standard from the company. The list of Sony's unsuccessful attempts to make their proprietary formats universally adopted includes Betamax, MiniDisc or the well-known abbreviated term, the MD, and Universal Media Disc.

In June 2006, Sony released the Blu-ray Disc format, a High-definition Optical disc format developed by the company in association with the Blu-ray Disc Association, in which Sony is a member of, alongside Philips, Panasonic and LG Electronics.

== Entry into computer games ==
In 1983, Sony Corporation begin selling the Hit Bit product for the MSX, which included a line of computers, and also published video games for the system, and its first entry into game publishing, but it sold well in Japan, South America, Spain (through Sony Spain) and Europe, but never released for North America.

The company's genesis into video game publishing were a predecessor to the later Sony Music Entertainment Japan (formerly CBS Sony Group) that later turned out Famicom games, which was later evolved into Sony Computer Entertainment (now Sony Interactive Entertainment), and CSG Imagesoft, which turned into Sony Electronic Publishing with Sony Imagesoft as one of the labels in 1991, and later evolved into Sony Computer Entertainment America and Sony Computer Entertainment Europe (now part of Sony Interactive Entertainment).

=== List of Hit Bit games ===
| Year | Title | Developer | Notes |
|---|---|---|---|
| 1983 | Computer Billiards | Konami | |
| 1983 | Crazy Train | Konami | |
| 1983 | Juno First | Konami | |
| 1983 | E.I. - Exa Innova | Programmers-3 | |
| 1983 | Lode Runner | Programmers-3 | |
| 1983 | Home Computer ABC | Sony | |
| 1983 | Mouser | Sony | |
| 1984 | Alpha Squadron | AG Corp. | |
| 1984 | MSX Shogi Game | Alpha Denshi | |
| 1984 | Mr. Wong's Loopy Laundry | Artic Computing Ltd. | European Spanish release only |
| 1984 | Raid on Bungeling Bay | Zap | |
| 1984 | Super Golf | Comtec | |
| 1984 | Sparkie | Konami | |
| 1984 | Track & Field II | Konami | European release only |
| 1984 | Four battle Mah-jong | MIA | |
| 1984 | Jump Coaster | Nippon Columbia | European Spanish release only |
| 1984 | Pinky Chase | Nippon Columbia | European Spanish release only |
| 1984 | Battle Cross | Omori Electric Company | |
| 1984 | Binary Land | Hudson Soft | European Spanish release only |
| 1984 | Scion | Seibu Denshi | |
| 1984 | Ali Baba and 40 Thieves | Sony | |
| 1984 | Computer Othello | Sony | |
| 1984 | Super Tennis | Takara | |
| 1984 | Sweet Acorn | Taito | European Spanish release only |
| 1984 | Senjyo | Tehkan Ltd. | |
| 1984 | Mr, Do! vs Unicorns | Universal | |
| 1984 | Dorodon | UPL | |
| 1985 | Bernard in the Castle | Indescomp | European Spanish release only |
| 1985 | Car Jamboree | Omoro Electric Company | |
| 1985 | Championship Lode Runner | Compile | |
| 1985 | Chess | Bug | |
| 1985 | Choplifter | Compile | |
| 1985 | Cosmo Explorer | Zap | |
| 1985 | FaceMaker | Spinnaker Software | European Spanish release only |
| 1985 | Graphic Master | HAL Laboratory | |
| 1985 | Kids on Keys | Spinnaker Software | European Spanish release only |
| 1985 | KinderComp | Spinnaker Software | European Spanish release only |
| 1985 | Lode Runner II | Compile | |
| 1985 | Macadam Bumper | ERE Informatique | European only game |
| 1985 | Music Studio G7 | Sony | |
| 1985 | Mystery: The Party | Sony | |
| 1985 | Payload | Zap | |
| 1985 | Print Lab | Sony | |
| 1985 | Sf Zone 1999 | Pixel | |
| 1985 | Star Blazer | Starcraft | |
| 1985 | Super Game Collection | Sony | |
| 1985 | Super Soccer | Takara | |
| 1985 | Tatika | ASCII Corporation | European Spanish release only |
| 1986 | Coaster Race | Sony | |
| 1986 | Farm Kit | Sony | European release only |
| 1986 | Gang Man | Hudson Soft | European Spanish release only |
| 1986 | Gall Force: Defense of Chaos | HAL Laboratory | |
| 1986 | Jyansei | Chatnoir | |
| 1986 | Kinetic Connection | Sadato Taneda | |
| 1986 | Magical Kid Whiz | Seibu Kaihatsu | |
| 1986 | Midnight Brothers | Zap | |
| 1986 | Myth of Darkness - Legend of Yamato Takeru | Zap | |
| 1986 | New Adam & Eve | Sony | |
| 1986 | Playball | Sony | |
| 1986 | Space Kit | Sony | European release only |
| 1986 | Traffic | Andromeda Software | |
| 1986 | Wrangler | Indescomp | European only game |
| 1987 | Gall Force: Eternal Story | Scaptrust | |
| 1987 | Hardball | Accolade | |
| 1987 | Kiki Kaikai | Taito | |
| 1987 | Kisei | Shogi Master | |
| 1987 | Replicart | KLON | |
| 1987 | Seikima II Special | CBS/Sony Group | |
| 1988 | Family Boxing | Wood Place | |
| 1988 | Igo Club | Sony | |
| 1988 | Playball II | Sony | |
| 1989 | Membership Golf | KLON | |
| 1989 | Playball III | Sony | |

== Beyond an electronics powerhouse ==
Sony played a major role in the development of Japan as a powerful exporter during the late 20th century. From the late 1980s to the early 2000s, it aggressively expanded into a variety of businesses, from film (Sony Pictures Entertainment) and insurance (Sony Life) to banking (Sony Bank) to internet service providing (So-net) and gaming (Sony Interactive Entertainment). It also beefed up the music business it had operated in Japan, CBS/Sony Record, and turned it into Sony Music Entertainment, a multinational music label group. Part of its motivation for expansion was the pursuit of "convergence," linking film, music, and digital electronics via the Internet. However this strategy ultimately failed, merely damaging Sony's balance sheet and making the company's business structure highly complex.

== Crisis and challenges ==
Howard Stringer, the first non-Japanese CEO of Sony, helped to reinvigorate the company's struggling media businesses, encouraging blockbusters such as Spider-Man while cutting 9,000 jobs. Despite modest success, the company faced continued struggles from the mid-2000s and started to lose the leading position in the tech industry. It became known for its stagnancy, with a fading brand name.

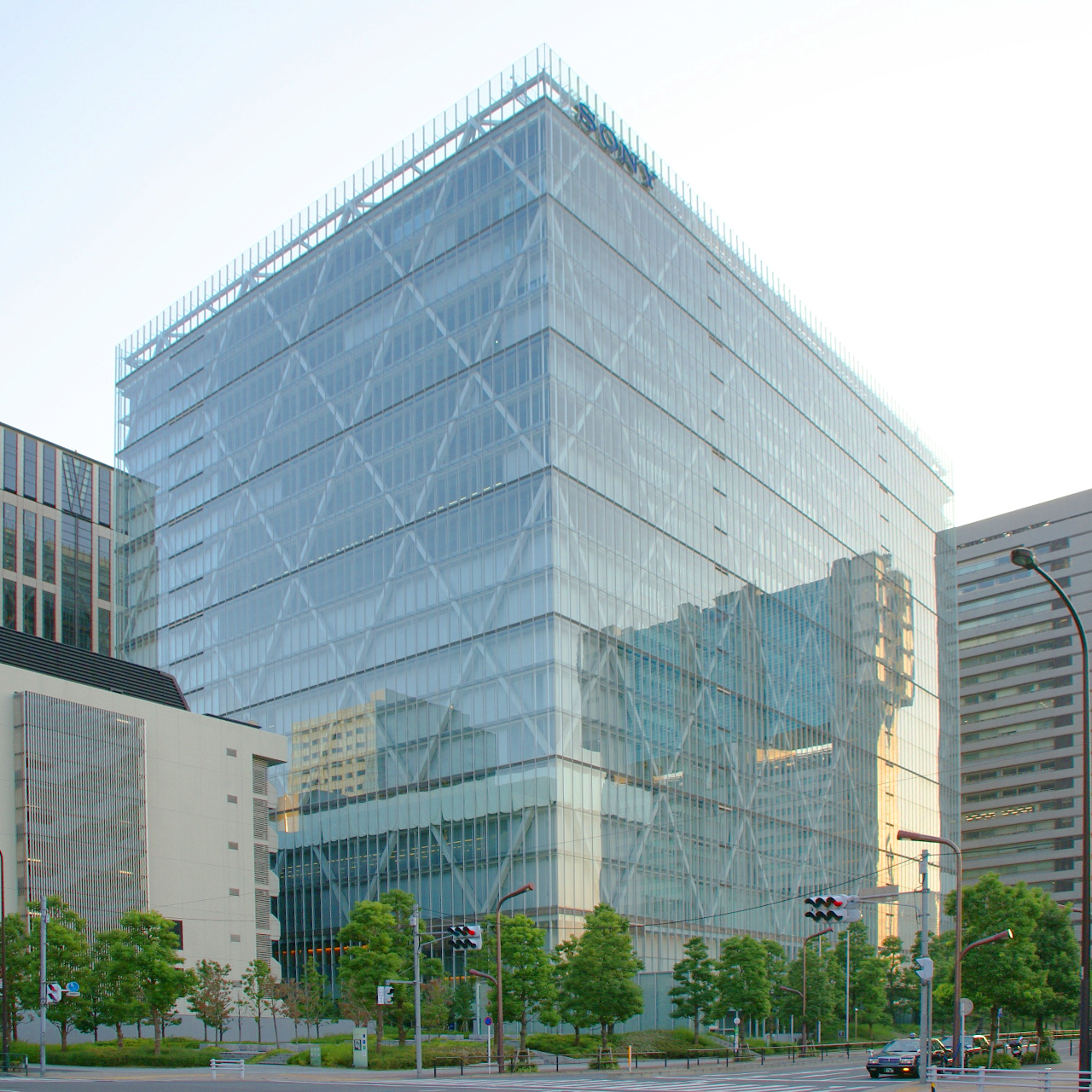
Sony Group Headquarters at Sony City in Minato, Tokyo

Sony's headquarters moved to Minato, Tokyo from Shinagawa, Tokyo around the end of 2006.
