= Made in Japan: Akio Morita and Sony =

Autobiography of Akio Morita

- Author: Akio Morita with Edward M. Reingold, Mitsuko Shimomura
- Language: English
- Genre: Autobiography
- Publication date: 1986
- Pages: 309

Made in Japan: Akio Morita and Sony is the 1986 autobiography of Akio Morita, co-founder and former chairman of Sony Corporation, written with Edwin M. Reingold and Mitsuko Shimomura. The book narrates the story of Morita's early life, the Sony Corporation's formation in the aftermath of Japan's brutal defeat in World War II and its subsequent rapid rise to international fame and fortune under Morita's leadership. It also offers insights into Japanese culture and ways of thinking, particularly in regards to business management.

Originally published in English (ISBN 0525244654), Made in Japan has since been translated into 12 different languages.

== Legacy ==
Robert Heller discusses Made in Japan in his 1989 book The Decision Makers, concluding that "the whole of (Morita's) career is an object lesson in making decisions that... have the future built in." Sheridan Tatsuno's Created in Japan also cites Morita's book as a warning against the West "(dismissing) signs of Japanese creativity, remaining too busy or too lazy to investigate further." In George Beahm's 2014 book Steve Jobs: Life by Design, Made in Japan is cited as an influence on Steve Jobs who is said to have closely studied the Japanese way of doing business.

Made in Japan was quoted by the Washington Post in their obituary of Morita after his death in 1999:

Our plan is to lead the public with new products rather than ask them what kind of products they want. The public does not know what is possible, but we do.

== Sections ==
The book is divided into the following nine sections:

1. War
2. Peace
3. Selling to the World (My learning curve)
4. On Management (It's all in the family)
5. American and Japanese Styles (The difference)
6. Competition (The fuel of Japanese Enterprise)
7. Technology (Survival Exercise)
8. Japan and the World (Alienation and Alliance)
9. World Trade (Averting Crisis)

== See also ==
- The Japan That Can Say No
- History of Sony
