= Neoconservatism in Japan =

Political movement

Neoconservatism (新保守主義, Shinhoshushugi) in Japan, also known as the neo-defense school (ネオ保守学派, Neo hoshu gakuha), is a term used by Asian media only recently to refer to a hawkish new generation of Japanese conservatives. They are distinguished from older Japanese conservatives in that they take a more "active" view of the Japanese Self-Defense Forces and are known for making what would be considered in the Western world politically incorrect statements (Shintaro Ishihara was particularly well known for this). Despite this, or perhaps because of it, they enjoy fair popularity across the nation, especially with the middle-aged population. The term is used in China, North Korea, and South Korea, as well as in Japan, to describe them.

As members of the post-war generation, they view themselves as free of responsibility or guilt for Japan's conquests and wartime history and Japanese war crimes. They view China as a country that harbors historical grievances for political gain, rather than accepting Japan's apologies. They express strong patriotic pride and stress Japan's international role. They view the North and South Korean-Japanese relationship as no longer particularly special, but rather desire to rebuild it as a "normal relationship"—one in which Japanese war guilt is no longer a factor in bilateral negotiations. Accordingly, they also support changing the Japanese constitution, especially Article 9 which is viewed as obsolete, so as to make progress towards "normalizing" Japan's status (that is to enable the country to re-arm to the level of most other countries).

The neoconservatives generally eschew traditional party-line factionalism, form alliances with lawmakers connected to defense, and create their own study committees. The bipartisan "Young Lawmaker's Group for Establishing Security in the New Century", founded in 2001, is the crux of the neoconservative group within the Japanese Diet. Note that the "Young" in the title is relative - being in their 40s and 50s, they are younger than the majority of powerful politicians who are in their 60s and 70s.

Early Neoconservatives embraced neoliberalism and rejected keynesianism. However this changed with Abenomics, which includes elements of both keynesianism and neoliberalism.

== Neoconservatives ==
The neoconservatives are a group of "younger" politicians, in their 40s and 50s. Notable neoconservatives often include:

- Shigeru Ishiba, former Prime Minister of Japan, former Minister of Defense and major proponent of Japan's involvement in the US-initiated Iraq War
- Shinzo Abe, former Prime Minister of Japan, the successor of Junichiro Koizumi, an anti-North Korea hardliner
- Tōru Hashimoto, former Mayor of Osaka
- Takashi Kawamura, former Mayor of Nagoya
- Shintaro Ishihara, former governor of Tokyo, and co-author of the controversial essay, "The Japan That Can Say No"
- Seiji Maehara, a hardliner and former Minister for Foreign Affairs
- Shoichi Nakagawa, Chairman of the Policy Research Council of the Liberal Democratic Party (LDP)
- Keizo Takemi, an LDP member and head of the "Young Lawmaker's Group"
- Ichita Yamamoto, head of the LDP team studying sanctions on North Korea

== Allies ==
Junichiro Koizumi, a former prime minister preceding Shinzo Abe, is a conservative in the foreign policy arena, and receives support from the neoconservative legislators, but is not himself considered a neoconservative.

== See also ==
- Political extremism in Japan
  - Uyoku dantai
- North Korean abductions of Japanese
- Japanese history textbook controversies
- Politics of Japan
- Sino-Japanese relations
- Japanese nationalism
- Ultraconservatism
