= Tokyo 3rd district =

Japan House of Representatives constituency

Tokyo 3rd District
- Parliamentary constituency for the Japanese House of Representatives
- Numbered map of inner Tokyo single-member districts
- Prefecture: Tokyo
- Proportional District: Tokyo
- Electorate: 361,953 1 September 2023

Current constituency
- Created: 1994
- Seats: One
- Party: LDP
- Representative: Hirotaka Ishihara
- Created from: Tokyo 2nd district

The Tokyo 3rd district (東京都第3区, Tōkyō-to dai-san-ku) is a constituency of the House of Representatives in the Diet of Japan (national legislature). It is located in Tokyo and encompasses Shinagawa ward and several outlying islands that belong to the Tokyo Metropolis.

Before the electoral reform of 1994, the area had been part of Tokyo 2nd district where five Representatives had been elected by single non-transferable vote.

Current representative from the Tokyo 3rd district is Hirotaka Ishihara (Liberal Democratic Party of Japan, LDP), the son of former prefectural governor and environment minister Shintarō Ishihara (Japan Restoration Party, formerly LDP) and brother of former environment minister Nobuteru Ishihara (LDP). In 2012, Ishihara narrowly beat incumbent Jin Matsubara (DPJ, Hatoyama and Kawabata groups) who began his political career in 1985 as a candidate for the Tokyo Metropolitan Assembly for the New Liberal Club and later represented Ōta in the Metropolitan Assembly as an independent with Zekin-tō ("Tax Party") support, subsequently joined the LDP, the Japan Renewal Party (JRP), the New Frontier Party (NFP), the Liberal Party, the Good Governance Party (GGP) and finally the Democratic Party (DPJ) in 1998.

== Area ==
=== Former Tokyo City ===
- Shinagawa ward

=== Izu Islands ===
- Ōshima Subprefecture
  - Ōshima Town
  - Toshima Village
  - Niijima Village
  - Kōzushima Village
- Miyake Subprefecture
  - Miyake Village
  - Mikurajima Village
- Hachijō Subprefecture
  - Hachijō Town
  - Aogashima Village

=== Ogasawara Subprefecture ===
- Ogasawara Village

== List of representatives ==
Representative	Party	Dates	Notes
Shinichiro Kurimoto	LDP	1996 – 2000	
Jin Matsubara	DPJ	2000 – 2005	Won seat in the Tokyo PR block
Hirotaka Ishihara	LDP	2005 – 2009	Failed reelection in the Tokyo PR block
Jin Matsubara	DPJ	2009 – 2012	Won seat in the Tokyo PR block
Hirotaka Ishihara	LDP	2012 – 2021	Won seat in the Tokyo PR block
Jin Matsubara	CDP	2021 – 2024	Moved to the 26th district
Hirotaka Ishihara	LDP	2024 –	

== Election results ==
2026
Party	Candidate	Votes	%	±%
LDP	Hirotaka Ishihara	93,158	42.6	▲12.0
Centrist Reform	Yumiko Abe	53,584	24.5	▼2.3
DPP	Shingo Ishida	34,805	15.9	▲0.9
Ishin	Tōru Ishizaki	19,403	8.9	▼3.9
Sanseitō	Hirotaka Ueki	17,544	8.0	▲3.7
Turnout			61.28	▲4.45
LDP hold				

2024
Party	Candidate	Votes	%	±%
LDP	Hirotaka Ishihara	61,660	30.59	▼12.31
CDP	Yumiko Abe (elected by PR)	54,178	26.88	▼19.02
DPP	Yuri Okumoto	30,351	15.06	
Ishin	Toshitaka Yoshihira	25,745	12.77	
JCP	Katsusuke Kōzai	12,056	5.98	▼5.32
Independent	Megumi Kawaguchi	8,822	4.38	
Sanseitō	Hirotaka Ueki	8,731	4.33	
Turnout		201,543	55.73	▼4.14
LDP gain from CDP				

2021
Party	Candidate	Votes	%	±%
CDP	Jin Matsubara	124,961	45.9	▲7.7
LDP	Hirotaka Ishihara (elected by PR)	116,753	42.9	▼0.71
JCP	Katsusuke Kōzai	30,648	11.3	▼6.99
Turnout		272,362	59.87	▲4.01
CDP gain from LDP		Swing	+7.7	

2017
Party	Candidate	Votes	%	±%
LDP	Hirotaka Ishihara	107,708	43.6	▼0.7
Kibō no Tō	Jin Matsubara (elected by PR)	94,380	38.2	▼4.4
JCP	Katsusuke Kōzai	45,088	18.2	▲5.1
Turnout			55.9	▲0.4
LDP hold				

2014
Party	Candidate	Votes	%	±%
LDP	Hirotaka Ishihara	115,623	44.3	▲2.3
Democratic	Jin Matsubara (elected by PR)	111,353	42.6	▲1.3
JCP	Katsusuke Kōzai	34,295	13.1	▲5.2
Turnout			55.5	▼8.2
LDP hold				

2012
Party	Candidate	Votes	%	±%
LDP (NK)	Hirotaka Ishihara	122,314	42.0	
DPJ (PNP)	Jin Matsubara (elected by PR)	120,298	41.3	
TPJ (NPD)	Gōkyū Ikeda	25,773	8.8	
JCP	Katsusuke Kōzai	23,167	7.9	

2009
Party	Candidate	Votes	%	±%
DPJ	Jin Matsubara	163,791		
LDP	Hirotaka Ishihara	121,699		
JCP	Eiji Sawada	28.221		
Turnout		319,070	67.3	

2005
Party	Candidate	Votes	%	±%
LDP	Hirotaka Ishihara	151,989		
DPJ	Jin Matsubara	123,999		
JCP	Hitoshi Gotō	23,611		
Turnout		306,013	66.85	

2003
Party	Candidate	Votes	%	±%
DPJ	Jin Matsubara	122,181		
LDP	Hirotaka Ishihara	113,494		
JCP	Kiyofumi Ōnuki	22615		
Turnout		266,636	59.45	

2000
Party	Candidate	Votes	%	±%
DPJ	Jin Matsubara	84,372		
LDP	Shō Naitō	82,954		
JCP	Hideto Wakitsuki	38,812		
LP	Ikuko Tsuboya	18,991		
SDP	Ran Mei	13,575		
Independent	Yatarō Iwasaki	7,269		
LL	Shintarō Kō	4,357		

2000
Party	Candidate	Votes	%	±%
LDP	Shin’ichirō Kurimoto	73,055		
NFP	Jin Matsubara	67,653		
JCP	Hideto Wakitsuki	43,263		
Sakigake	Noboru Usami	35,025		
Independent	Yatarō Iwasaki	7,982		
Turnout		235,346	55.47	
