= Yoshizumi Ishihara =

Japanese meteorologist

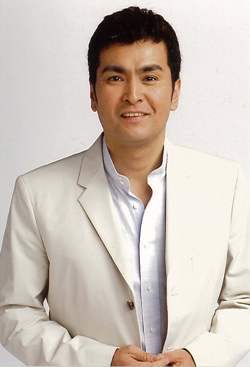
- Born: 15 January 1962 (age 63); Zushi, Kanagawa
- Occupation(s): Weather forecaster, actor
- Years active: 1982–Present
- Employer: Fuji Television
- Parent(s): Shintaro Ishihara; Noriko Ishihara
- Relatives: Nobuteru Ishihara; Hirotaka Ishihara
- Website: Official website

Yoshizumi Ishihara (石原 良純, Ishihara Yoshizumi; born 15 January 1962) is a Japanese weather presenter, TV personality, and actor. Born in Zushi, Kanagawa, he is the second son of Tokyo governor Shintaro Ishihara, and brother of politicians Nobuteru Ishihara and Hirotaka Ishihara.

== Biography ==
Ishihara was born on 15 January 1962 in Zushi, Kanagawa.

He entered Keio University in 1980 to study Economics.

He is a self-proclaimed railway enthusiast.

== Works ==
=== Films ===
(Incomplete list)

- Kyōdan (1982)
- Ashita no Watashi no Tsukurikata (2007)
- Adrift in Tokyo (2007)

=== Television drama ===
- Seibu Keisatsu (1983–84), Detective Jun Godai
- Taiyō ni Hoero! (1984–86), Detective Yu "Microcomputer" Mizuki
- Yoshitsune (2005), Minamoto no Noriyori
- Tenchijin (2009), Fukushima Masanori
- Yū-san no Nyōbō (2021), Shintaro Ishihara

=== Variety shows ===
- Waratte Iitomo!
- Zawatsuku Kinyō-bi (2018–present)

=== TV commercials ===
- NTT Town Page (since 2007)
