= Jin Matsubara =

Japanese politician (born 1956)

- 松原 仁
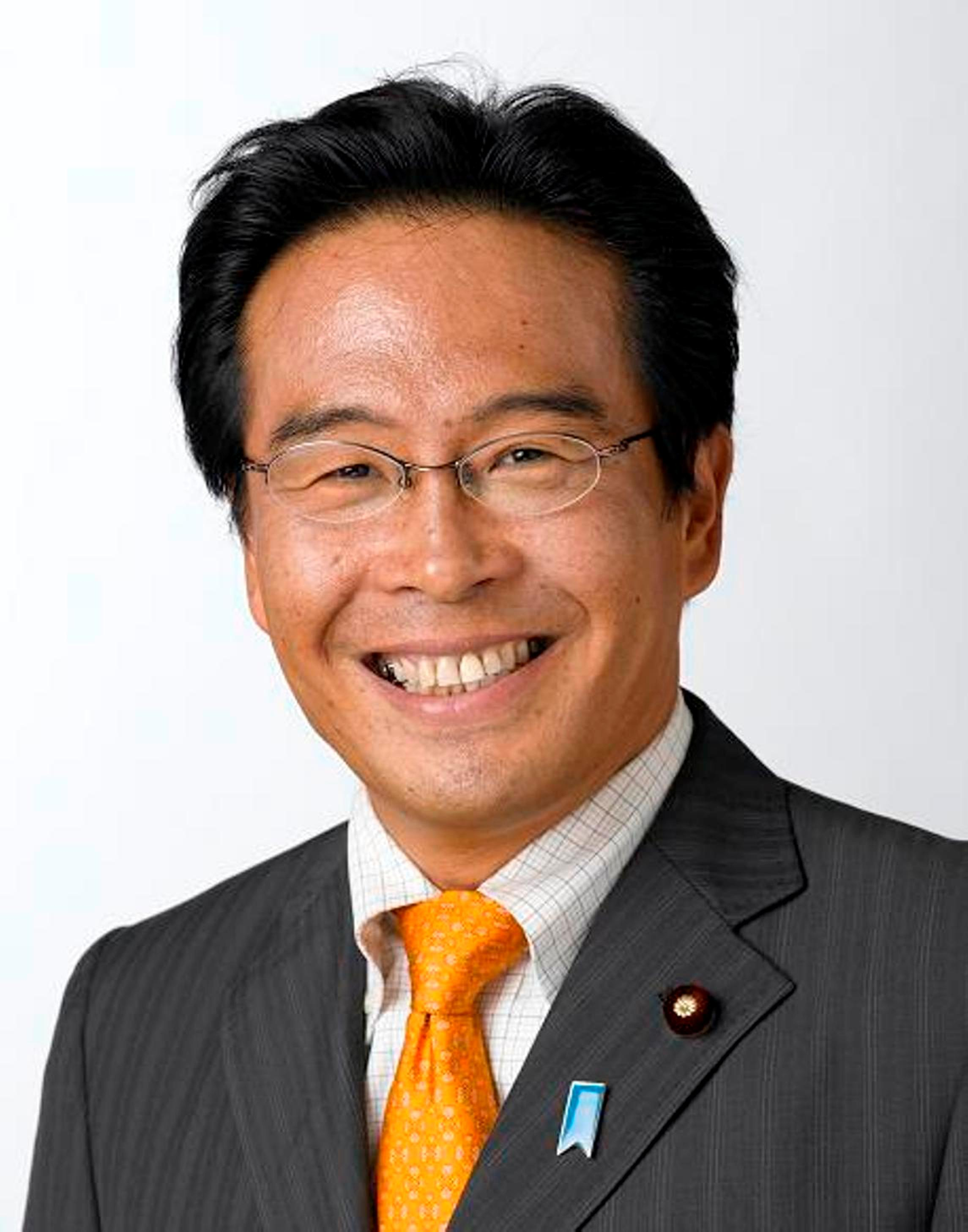
- Official portrait, 2011

Chairman of the National Public Safety Commission
- In office 13 January 2012 – 1 October 2012
- Prime Minister: Yoshihiko Noda
- Preceded by: Kenji Yamaoka
- Succeeded by: Tadamasa Kodaira

Minister for the Abduction Issue
- In office 13 January 2012 – 1 October 2012
- Prime Minister: Yoshihiko Noda
- Preceded by: Kenji Yamaoka
- Succeeded by: Keishu Tanaka

Member of the House of Representatives; from Tokyo
- In office 25 June 2000 – 23 January 2026
- Preceded by: Shinichiro Kurimoto
- Succeeded by: Ueki Imaoka
- Constituency: See list: 3rd district (2000–2005); PR block (2005–2009); 3rd district (2009–2012); PR block (2012–2021); 3rd district (2021–2024); 26th district (2024–2026)

Member of Tokyo Metropolitan Assembly
- In office 1989–1996
- Constituency: Ōta Ward

Personal details
- Born: 松原仁 (Matsubara Jin); 31 July 1956 (age 70) Itabashi, Tokyo, Japan
- Party: Independent (1986–1990; 2023–present)
- Other political affiliations: NLC (1985–1986); LDP (1990–1994); NFP (1994–1996); Sun (1996–1998); GGP (1998); DPJ (1998–2016); DP (2016–2017); KnT (2017–2018); GOI (2018–2020); CDP (2020–2023)
- Children: 3
- Education: Waseda University
- Website: Official Website

Jin Matsubara (松原 仁, Matsubara Jin; born 31 July 1956) is a Japanese politician who served as a member of the House of Representatives in the Diet (national legislature). He was appointed Chairman of the National Public Safety Commission, Minister of State for Consumer Affairs and Food Safety and Minister for the Abduction Issue. Matsubara was formerly affiliated with Party of Hope and the Democratic Party (the Democratic Party of Japan).

== Political career ==
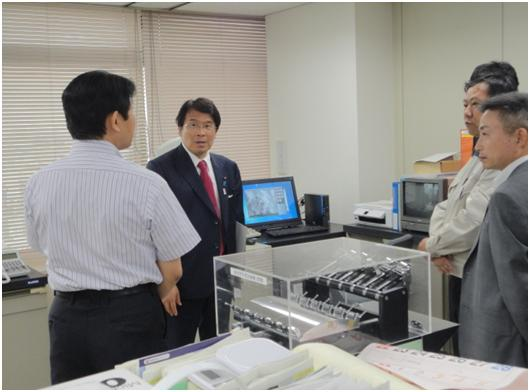
Matsubara inspecting the Tokyo Metropolitan Comprehensive Consumer Center in 2012

In the first cabinet reshuffle of Democratic Party Prime Minister Yoshihiko Noda on 13 January 2012 he was appointed Chairman of the National Public Safety Commission, Minister of State for Consumer Affairs and Food Safety and Minister for the Abduction Issue. He left the cabinet on the 1 October 2012 cabinet reshuffle. Tadamasa Kodaira replaced him as Chairman of the National Public Safety Commission and Minister of State for Consumer Affairs and Food Safety, and Keishu Tanaka took over as Minister for the Abduction Issue.

== Personal life ==
Matsubara is married with three children. His oldest son Hajime Matsubara is a member of the Ota city assembly.

== Views on Second Sino-Japanese War and the Second World War ==
He was a supporter of right-wing filmmaker Satoru Mizushima's 2007 denialist film The Truth about Nanjing, which denied that the Nanjing Massacre ever occurred. In 2014 he refused to retract his comments denying the massacre.

During Diet discussions of Japanese government efforts to clean up chemical weapons abandoned in China at the end of the Second World War, Matsubara questioned the existence of such weapons.

On Monday 27 August 2012 Matsubara told a House of Councillors budget committee meeting that he may propose to other ministers a review of the 1993 statement by then Chief Cabinet Secretary Yōhei Kōno admitting the Imperial Japanese Army's role in establishing and running "comfort stations" for troops with forcibly recruited comfort women, because "no direct descriptions of forcible recruitment have been found in military and other Japanese official records obtained by the government."

== Visit to Yasukuni shrine ==
On 15 August 2012, Matsubara, along with Minister of Land, Infrastructure, Transport and Tourism Yuichiro Hata became the first cabinet ministers of the DPJ to openly visit the controversial Yasukuni Shrine since the party came to power in 2009. Matsubara made his visit to commemorate the 67th anniversary of the end of World War II despite requests from Prime Minister Yoshihiko Noda to refrain from doing so.

House of Representatives (Japan)
Preceded by (17 Representatives)	Representative for the Tokyo PR block 2012–present 2005–2009	Incumbent
Preceded by (17 Representatives)	Representative for the Tokyo PR block 2012–present 2005–2009	Succeeded by (17 Representatives)
Preceded by Hirotaka Ishihara	Representative for Tokyo 3rd district 2009–2012	Succeeded by Hirotaka Ishihara
Preceded by Shinichirō Kurimoto	Representative for Tokyo 3rd district 2000–2005	Succeeded by Hirotaka Ishihara
