= Ueki Imaoka =

Japanese politician (born 1988)

- 今岡 植
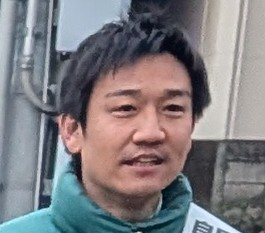
- Imaoka in 2026

Member of the House of Representatives
- Incumbent
- Assumed office 8 February 2026
- Preceded by: Jin Matsubara
- Constituency: Tokyo 26th

Personal details
- Born: 5 March 1988 (age 38) Singapore
- Party: Liberal Democratic
- Education: Waseda University; University of Pennsylvania; Hitotsubashi University

Ueki Imaoka (今岡植, Imaoka Ueki; born 5 March 1988) is a Japanese politician serving as a member of the House of Representatives since 2026. He previously worked at the Ministry of Finance.
