= Tokyo 26th district =

Electoral district in Tokyo, Japan

Tokyo 26th District
- 東京都第26区
- Parliamentary constituency for the Japanese House of Representatives
- Prefecture: Tokyo
- Proportional District: Tokyo
- Electorate: 430,474 (as of September 2022)

Current constituency
- Created: 2022
- Seats: One
- Party: LDP
- Representatives: Ueki Imaoka
- Created from: Parts of: Tokyo 3rd; Tokyo 4th; Tokyo 5th; Tokyo 7th

Tokyo 26th District (東京都第26区, Tokyo-to dai-nijuroku-ku; or 東京26区, Tokyo nijuroku-ku) is an electoral district in the Japanese House of Representatives. It was first created as part of the 2022 reapportionments that added five districts in Tokyo. The incumbent of the 3rd district, former cabinet minister Jin Matsubara became the first representative as a result of the 2024 general election.

== Areas covered ==
=== Current district ===
As of 11 January 2023, the areas covered by the district are as follows:

- Meguro
- Ōta, Tokyo (western section)
  - Minemachi, Denenchofu, Unoki, Yukigaya and Senzoku branch offices
  - Kugahara branch office (excluding Ikegami-3)
  - Yaguchi branch office (excluding Yaguchi 2 (1, 13, 14, 27 and 28) and Yaguchi 3 (1 and 8)

Before the creation of this district, Meguro Ward was split between the 5th and 6th districts, and the western Ota Ward area was split between the 3rd and 4th districts.

== Elected representatives ==
Representative	Party	Years served	Notes
Jin Matsubara	Independent	2024 – 2026	Moved from the 3rd district
Ueki Imaoka	LDP	2026 –	

== Election results ==
2026
Party	Candidate	Votes	%	±%
LDP	Ueki Imaoka	92,329	34.7	▲5.8
Independent	Jin Matsubara	82,119	30.8	▼14.8
Team Mirai	Noboru Usami (elected by PR)	34,706	13.0	
DPP	Yūki Sakamoto	24,307	9.1	
JCP	Kanako Matsui	19,663	7.4	▼4.7
Sanseitō	Keiko Suganuma	13,072	4.9	▼2.4
Turnout			62.57	▲5.40
LDP gain from Independent				

2024
Party	Candidate	Votes	%	±%
Independent	Jin Matsubara	108,174	45.6	
LDP	Ueki Imaoka	68,568	28.9	
JCP	Masako Wada	28,819	12.1	
Sanseitō	Kumi Fujita	17,250	7.3	
Independent	Masafumi Tabuchi	14,602	6.2	
Turnout			57.17	
