= Akio Morita =

Japanese entrepreneur (1921–1999)

Akio Morita Senior Third Rank
- 盛田 昭夫
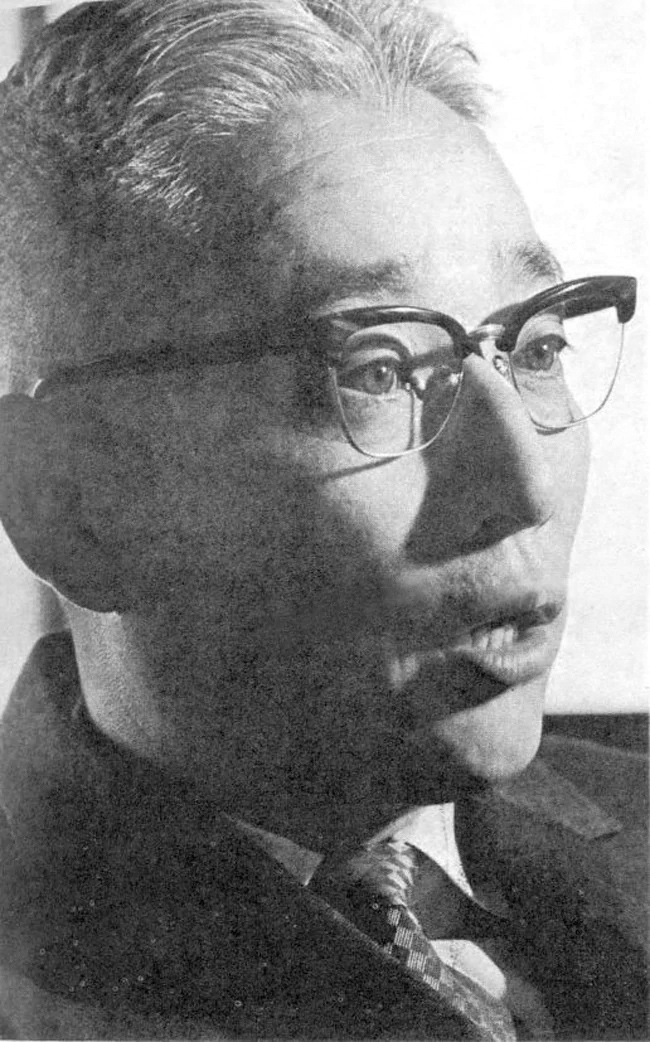
- Morita in 1965
- Born: January 26, 1921; Nagoya, Empire of Japan
- Died: October 3, 1999 (aged 78); Tokyo, Japan
- Education: Osaka University (BS)
- Known for: Co-founder of Sony
- Spouse: Yoshiko Kamei
- Children: 3
- Awards: Albert Medal (1982)
- Military career
- Allegiance: Empire of Japan
- Branch: Imperial Japanese Navy
- Rank: Sub-Lieutenant
- Conflicts: World War II

Akio Morita (盛田 昭夫, Morita Akio; January 26, 1921 – October 3, 1999) was a Japanese entrepreneur and co-founder of Sony along with Masaru Ibuka.

== Early life ==
Akio Morita was born in Nagoya. Morita's family was involved in sake, miso and soy sauce production in the village of Kosugaya (currently a part of Tokoname City) on the western coast of Chita Peninsula in Aichi Prefecture since 1665. He was the oldest of four siblings and his father Kyuzaemon trained him as a child to take over the family business. Akio, however, found his true calling in mathematics and physics, and in 1944 he graduated from Osaka Imperial University with a degree in physics. He was later commissioned as a sub-lieutenant in the Imperial Japanese Navy, and served in World War II. During his service, Morita met his future business partner Masaru Ibuka at a study group for developing infrared-guided bombs (Ke-Go) in the Navy's Wartime Research Committee.

== Sony ==
In September 1945, Ibuka founded a radio repair shop in the bombed out Shirokiya Department Store in Nihonbashi, Tokyo. Morita saw a newspaper article about Ibuka's new venture and, after some correspondence, chose to join him in Tokyo. With funding from Morita's father, they co-founded Tokyo Tsushin Kogyo Kabushiki Kaisha (Tokyo Telecommunications Engineering Corporation, the forerunner of Sony Corporation) in 1946 with about 20 employees and initial capital of ¥190,000.

In 1949, the company developed magnetic recording tape and, in 1950, sold the first tape recorder in Japan. Ibuka was instrumental in securing the licensing of transistor technology from Bell Labs to Sony in the 1950s, thus making Sony one of the first companies to apply transistor technology to non-military uses. In 1957, the company produced a pocket-sized radio (the first to be fully transistorized), and in 1958, Morita and Ibuka decided to rename their company Sony (derived from "sonus"—Latin for "sound"—and "sonny", a then-common American expression). Morita was an advocate for all the products made by Sony. However, since the radio was slightly too big to fit in a shirt pocket, Morita made his employees wear shirts with slightly larger pockets to give the radio a "pocket sized" appearance.

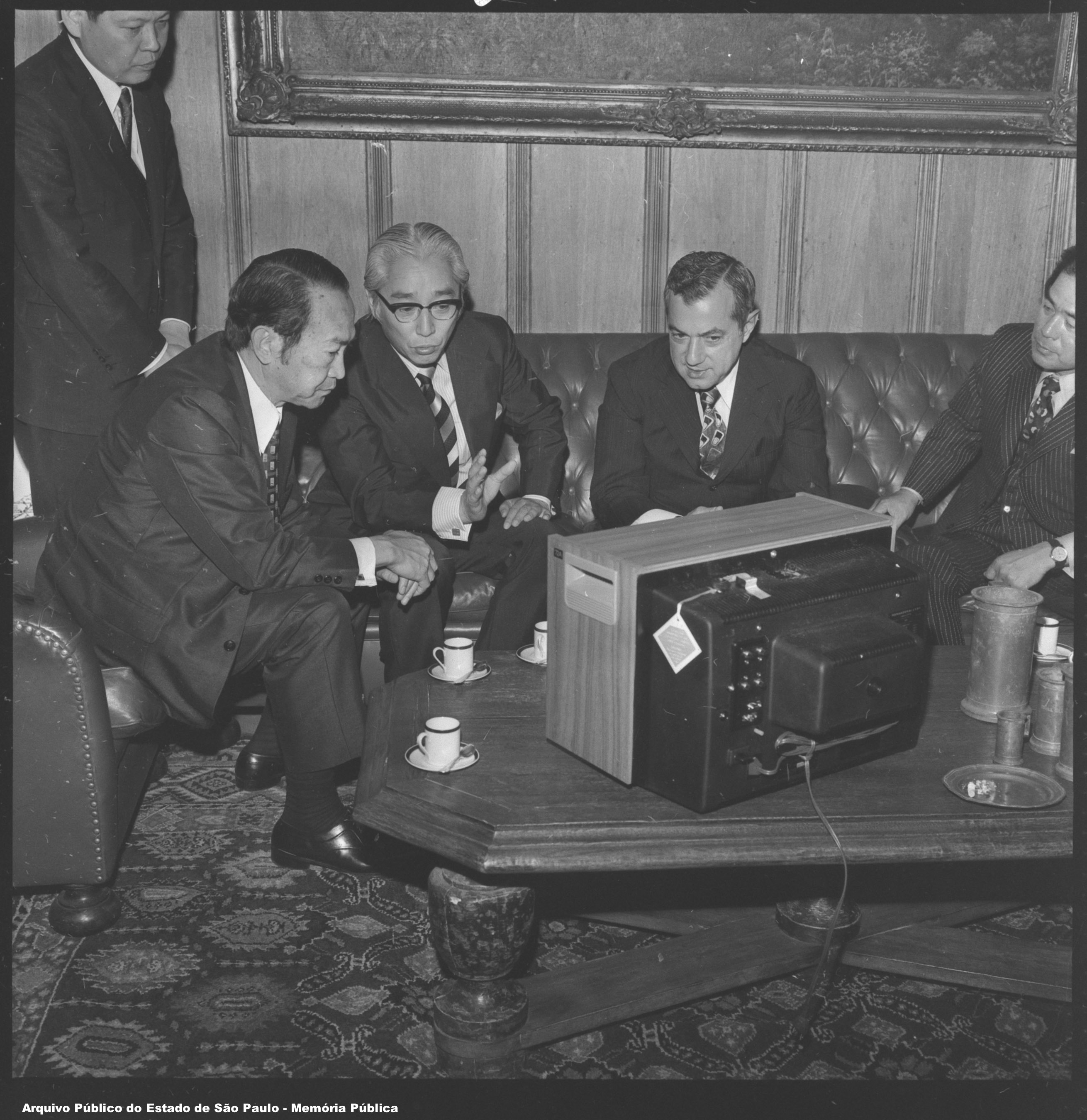
Morita presenting a Sony Trinitron to São Paulo governor Laudo Natel in 1972

Morita founded Sony Corporation of America (SONAM, currently abbreviated as SCA) in 1960. In the process, he was struck by the mobility of employees between American companies, which was unheard of in Japan at that time. When he returned to Japan, he encouraged experienced, middle-aged employees of other companies to reevaluate their careers and consider joining Sony. The company filled many positions in this manner, and inspired other Japanese companies to do the same. In 1961, Sony Corporation was the first Japanese company to be listed on the New York Stock Exchange, in the form of American depositary receipts (ADRs).

In March 1968, Morita set up a joint venture in Japan between Sony and CBS Records, with him as president, to manufacture "software" for Sony's hardware.

Morita became president of Sony in 1971, taking over from Ibuka who had served from 1950 to 1971. In 1975, Sony released the first Betamax home videocassette recorder, a year before the VHS format came out.

Ibuka retired in 1976 and Morita was named chairman of the company. In 1979, the Walkman was introduced, making it one of the world's first portable music players and in 1982, Sony launched the world's first compact disc player, the Sony CDP-101, with a compact disc (CD) itself, a new data storage format Sony and Philips co-developed. In that year, a 3.5-inch floppy disk structure was introduced by Sony, and it soon became the defacto standard. In 1984, Sony launched the Discman series, which extended their Walkman brand to portable CD products.

Under the vision of Morita, the company aggressively expanded into new businesses. Part of its motivation for doing so was the pursuit of "convergence", linking film, music and digital electronics. Twenty years after setting up a joint venture with CBS Records in Japan, Sony bought CBS Records Group which consisted of Columbia Records, Epic Records and other CBS labels. In 1989, they acquired Columbia Pictures Entertainment (Columbia Pictures, TriStar Pictures and others).

Norio Ohga, who had joined the company in the 1950s after sending Morita a letter denouncing the poor quality of the company's tape recorders, succeeded Morita as chief executive officer in 1989.

Morita suffered a cerebral hemorrhage in 1993 while playing tennis and on November 25, 1994, stepped down as Sony chairman to be succeeded by Ohga.

== Other affiliations ==
Morita was vice chairman of the Japan Business Federation (Japan Federation of Economic Organizations), and was a member of the Japan-U.S. Economic Relations Group, also known as the "Wise Men's Group". He helped General Motors with its acquisition of an interest in Isuzu in 1972. He was the third Japanese chairman of the Trilateral Commission. His amateur radio call sign is JP1DPJ.

== Publications ==
In 1966, Morita wrote a book called Gakureki Muyō Ron (学歴無用論, Never Mind School Records), where he stresses that school records are not important to success or one's business skills. In 1986, Morita wrote an autobiography titled Made in Japan. He co-authored the 1991 book The Japan That Can Say No with politician Shintaro Ishihara, where they criticized American business practices and encouraged Japanese to take a more independent role in business and foreign affairs. (Actually, Morita had no intention to criticize American practices at that time.) The book was translated into English and caused controversy in the United States, and Morita later had his chapters removed from the English version and distanced himself from the book.

== Awards and honours ==
In 1972, Morita received the Golden Plate Award of the American Academy of Achievement. Morita was awarded the Albert Medal by the United Kingdom's Royal Society of Arts in 1982, the first Japanese to receive the honor. Two years later, he received the prestigious Legion of Honour, and in 1991, was awarded the First Class Order of the Sacred Treasure from the Emperor of Japan. He was elected to the American Philosophical Society in 1992 and the American Academy of Arts and Sciences in 1993. That same year, he was awarded an honorary British knighthood (KBE). Morita received the International Distinguished Entrepreneur Award from the University of Manitoba in 1987. In 1998, he was the only Asian person on Time magazine's list of the 20 most influential business people of the 20th century as part of their Time 100: The Most Important People of the Century. He was posthumously awarded the Grand Cordon of the Order of the Rising Sun in 1999. In 2003, Anaheim University's Graduate School of Business was renamed the Akio Morita School of Business in his honor. The Morita family's support for the program led to the growth of the Anaheim University Akio Morita School of Business in Tokyo, Japan.

== Television commercials ==
- American Express (1984)

== Death ==
Morita, who loved to play golf and tennis, suffered a stroke in 1993, during a game of tennis. The stroke weakened him and left him in a wheelchair. On November 25, 1994, he stepped down as Sony chairman. On October 3, 1999, Morita died of pneumonia at the age of 78 in a Tokyo hospital, where he had been admitted since August 1999.

Business positions
Preceded by Masaru Ibuka	Chairman of Sony; 1976–1994	Succeeded by Norio Ohga
