= Internet Breakthrough Party of Japan =

Political party in Japan

The Internet Breakthrough Party of Japan (電脳突破党, Dennō Toppa-tō) was a one-member party run by Shinichiro Kurimoto (栗本 慎一郎, Kurimoto Shinichiro), an academic, writer, and frequent Iron Chef judge and former member of the House of Representatives.

== See also ==
- Manabu Miyazaki: The president of the party.
