= Shirokiya Department Store fire =

1932 fire in Tokyo, Japan

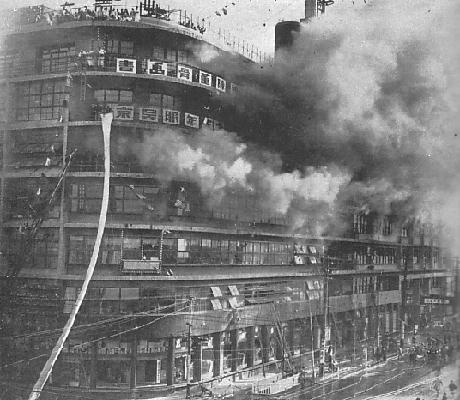
The department store on fire.

Shirokiya Department Store fire (白木屋大火, Shirokiya Taika) was a fire at the Shirokiya Department Store, Tokyo, Japan, on December 16, 1932 which left 14 people dead and 67 people injured. The Shirokiya Department store had eight stories and two underground floors. Floors 4 through 8 caught fire in the incident.

It is thought in Japan that the Shirokiya Department Store fire was a catalyst for the change in fashion customs towards women wearing Western-style underwear, but there is no evidence to substantiate the belief.

== Fire ==
At the time, the Shirokiya Department Store was having a year-end Christmas theme sale, and the interior was extravagantly decorated. The fire started around 9:15am, shortly before it was to open for business, in the toy section. A clerk witnessed an electrical spark from a light bulb on a Christmas tree. The spark landed on some highly flammable celluloid toys, ignited them, and the fire quickly spread. The open staircase provided oxygen to fuel the flames and enabled the fire to spread to other floors. The staircase became a chimney for the smoke, which cut off the main escape route.

As ladder trucks and hoses could not reach the 5th floor, the fire spread and people trapped inside had to find other ways to escape. Some of the saleswomen were forced to go up to the roof; from there they jumped into safety nets held by firemen. Many attempted to escape the building using ropes made from clothing or curtains. About 80 people climbed down from the 7th floor in this manner. Others could not hang on and fell to their deaths.

== Urban legend ==
It is believed that this fire changed fashion customs among Japanese women, who discarded the traditional kimono since kimono-clad women did not wear underwear. News spread that, during the fire, saleswomen in kimono refused to jump from the roof into safety nets because they were ashamed to be seen from below, and as a result died. This news attracted attention from as far away as Europe. It has been alleged that in the aftermath of the fire, department store management ordered saleswomen to wear underwear or other short undergarments under their kimono, and the trend spread.

Contrary to this belief, Shoichi Inoue, a professor of Japanese customs and architecture at the International Research Center for Japanese Studies, has denied the story of the ambivalent women with fatal modesty. According to Inoue, most people were saved by firemen, and the story of women who preferred to die with their modesty intact was fabricated for the benefit of Westerners. The story has been prevalent in many reference books, even some published by the Fire Fighting Agency.
