= Hirotaka Ishihara =

Japanese politician

- 石原 宏高
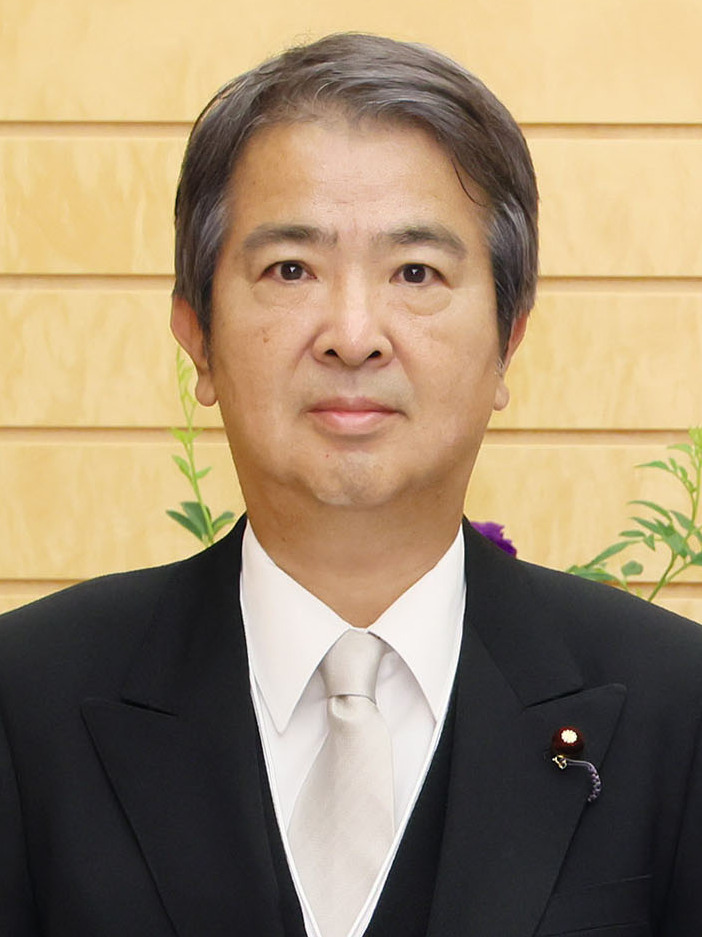
- Ishihara in 2023

Minister of the Environment
- In office 21 October 2025 – 17 September 2026
- Prime Minister: Sanae Takaichi
- Preceded by: Keiichiro Asao
- Succeeded by: Hiroyoshi Sasagawa

Member of the House of Representatives
- Incumbent
- Assumed office 18 December 2012
- Preceded by: Jin Matsubara
- Constituency: Tokyo 3rd (2012–2021); Tokyo PR (2021–2024); Tokyo 3rd (2024–present)
- In office 11 September 2005 – 21 July 2009
- Preceded by: Jin Matsubara
- Succeeded by: Jin Matsubara
- Constituency: Tokyo 3rd

Personal details
- Born: 19 June 1964 (age 62) Zushi, Kanagawa, Japan
- Party: Liberal Democratic
- Parent: Shintaro Ishihara (father)
- Relatives: Nobuteru Ishihara (brother); Yoshizumi Ishihara (brother); Nobuhiro Ishihara (brother)
- Education: Keio University
- Website: 衆議院議員石原ひろたか

Hirotaka Ishihara (石原 宏高, Ishihara Hirotaka; born 19 June 1964) is a Japanese politician of the Liberal Democratic Party, a member of the House of Representatives in the Diet (national legislature). He has been Minister of the Environment within Prime Minister Sanae Takaichi's cabinet since 2025. A native of Kanagawa Prefecture and graduate of Keio University, he was elected to the House of Representatives for the first time in 2005 after an unsuccessful run in 2003. He is the son of Shintaro Ishihara, former governor of Tokyo, and like his father affiliated to the revisionist lobby Nippon Kaigi.

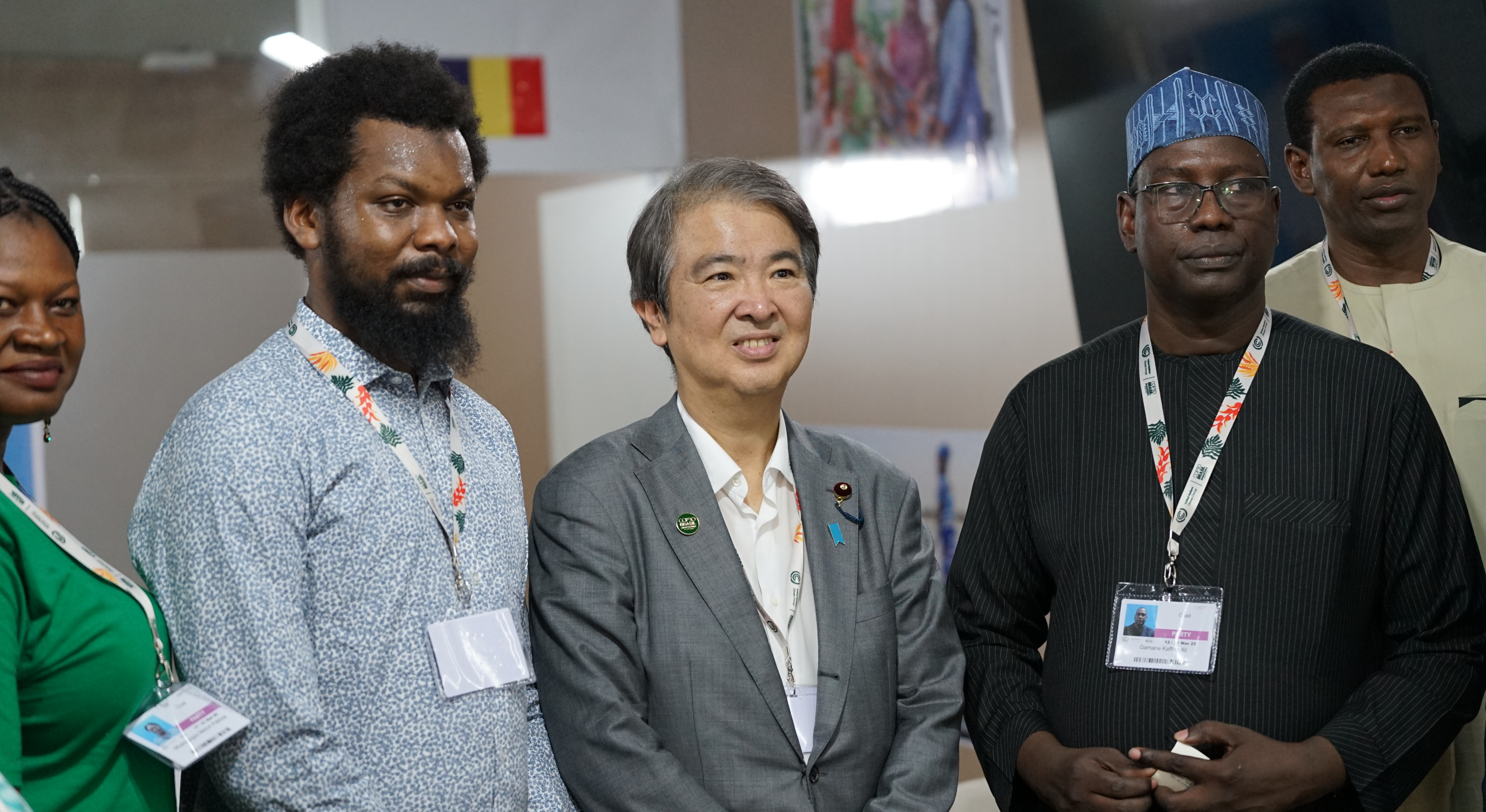
Ishihara visiting the Chad Pavillion at COP30 (2025)

== See also ==
- Koizumi Children

House of Representatives (Japan)
Preceded by Jin Matsubara	Representative for Tokyo 3rd district 2005–2009; 2012–21	Succeeded by Jin Matsubara
Preceded by Jin Matsubara	Representative for Tokyo 3rd district 2005–2009; 2012–21	Succeeded by Jin Matsubara
