= So-net =

Japanese internet service provider

Sony Network Communications Inc.

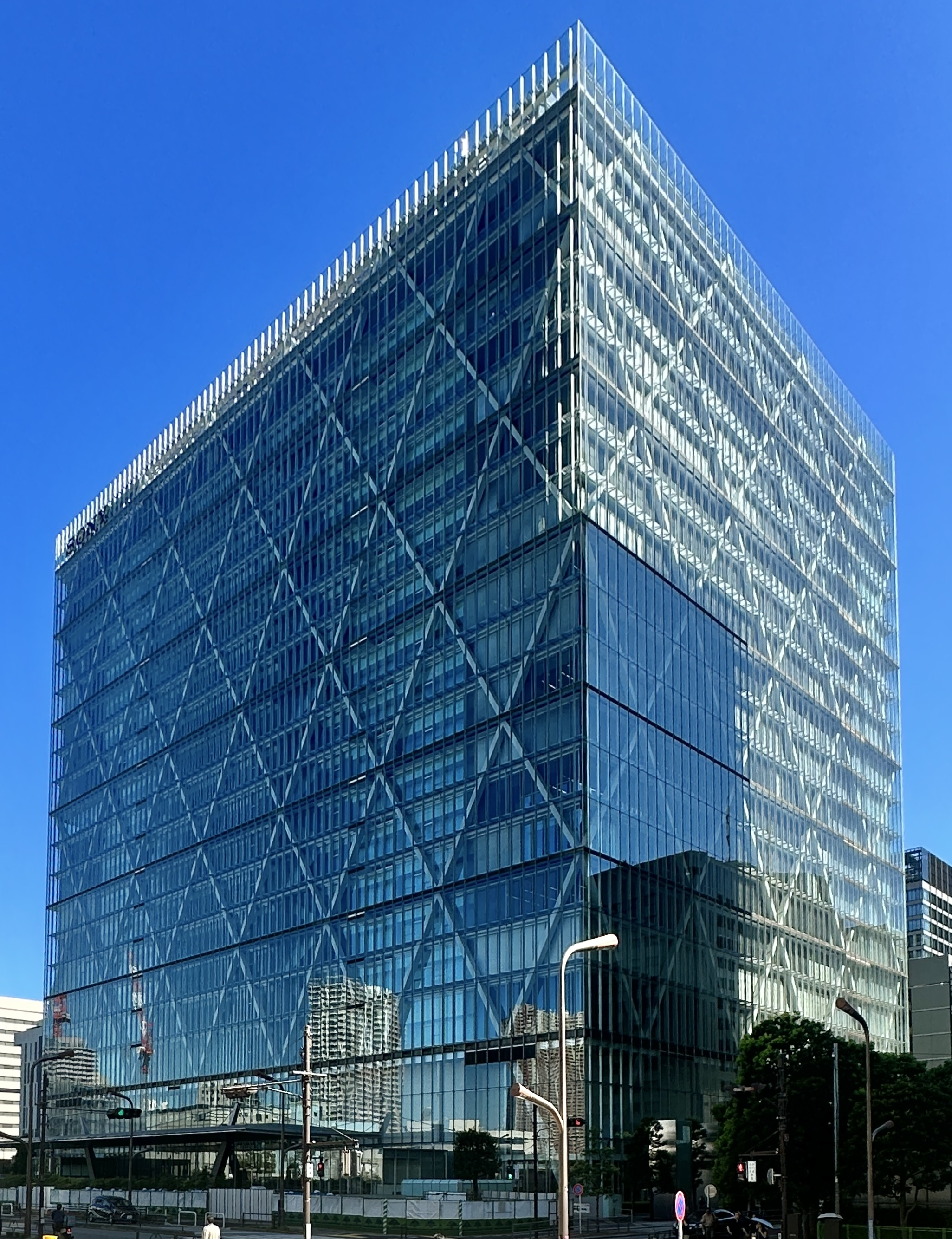
- Headquarters at Sony City
- Native name: ソニーネットワークコミュニケーションズ株式会社
- Type: Subsidiary
- Industry: Information and communication industry
- Founded: November 1, 1995; 31 years ago
- Headquarters: Sony City, Toranomon, Minato, Tokyo, Japan
- Key people: Noriyoshi Nakagawa (president)
- Number of employees: 1867 (as of 2023)
- Parent: Sony
- Website: www.sonynetwork.co.jp/corporation/en/

So-net (ソネット, So-netto) is a Japanese internet service provider operated by Sony Network Communications Inc. (ソニーネットワークコミュニケーションズ株式会社, Sonī Network Communications Kabushiki Gaisha), a wholly owned subsidiary of Sony.

In June 2015 – So-net launches Nuro Hikari 10G, a FTTH service that provides 10 Gbit/s internet. The service leads 10G marketing war in Japan.

== Services ==
- Communication services
- IoT Products and Services
- AI services
- Solution services

== Subsidiaries ==
- Sony Biz Network
- So-net Game Studio
- SoVeC
- So-net Entertainment Taiwan
- Sony Network Communication Europe
