= Shinichiro Kurimoto =

Japanese academic

- 栗本 慎一郎
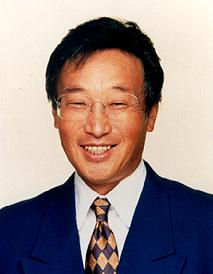
- Official portrait, 1997

Member of the House of Representatives
- In office 18 July 1993 – 2 June 2000
- Preceded by: Yoshihisa Inoue
- Succeeded by: Jin Matsubara
- Constituency: Former Tokyo 3rd (1993–1996); Tokyo 3rd (1996–2000)

Personal details
- Born: 23 November 1941 (age 84) Tokyo, Japan
- Party: Liberal Democratic
- Other political affiliations: Renewal (1993–1994); Liberal League
- Education: Keio University

Shinichiro Kurimoto (栗本 慎一郎, Kurimoto Shin'ichirō; born 1941 in Tokyo) is a Japanese author and former politician. He is also an economic anthropologist who introduced the ideas of Karl Polanyi and his younger brother Michael Polanyi to Japan. He was a professor at universities including Meiji University and Northwestern University.

During the 1980s his works were categorized in Japan as "new academism", alongside works by Akira Asada, Kojin Karatani and Shigehiko Hasumi.

He was politically affiliated with the Liberal Democratic Party, as well as the Internet Breakthrough Party of Japan.

He frequently acted as a judge in the television show Iron Chef, appearing in 109 episodes.

== Works ==
=== Academic books ===
- Economic Anthropology 経済人類学
- Economy as Illusions 幻想としての経済
- Apes in Pants パンツをはいたサル ISBN 4768468993 ISBN 978-4768468999
- The Iron Maiden 鉄の処女
- Meaning and Living 意味と生命
- Budapest Story ブダペスト物語

=== Literary books ===
- Against Girls 反少女 (short stories)
- Against Literary Theories 反文学論 (criticism)
- The Blood of Tokyo Cries 東京の血はどおーんと騒ぐ (an essay like a novel)

== See also ==
- Tacit knowledge
- Peter Drucker
- Masayuki Yamato
