= Sony TV8-301 =

The TV8-301 was a small black-and-white television made by Sony. It is notable for being the world's first non-projection type all-transistor television. It had an eight-inch screen. It was also portable, having a bay in the back for two 6-volt lead–acid batteries. It was priced high, as it was innovative in many ways, so, to the average consumer it was something of a luxury item and not a practical buy. Additionally, this television was rather prone to malfunction, which led to it being called Sony's "frail little baby". Released on the market in 1960, it was discontinued in 1962.

== Technical data ==
- Transistors: 23 (silicon and germanium)
- Diodes: 15 + 2 high-voltage (17)
