= Masaru Ibuka =

Japanese businessman (1908–1997)

- 井深 大
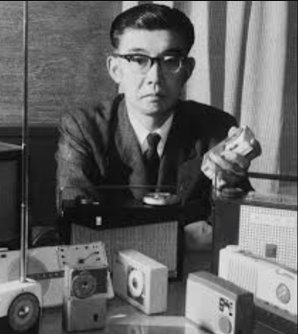
- Born: April 11, 1908; Nikkō, Empire of Japan
- Died: December 19, 1997 (aged 89); Tokyo, Japan
- Education: Waseda University
- Known for: Co-founder of Sony
- Spouse: Sekiko Maeda (m. 1936, divorced)
- Children: 2 daughters, 1 son
- Awards: IEEE Founders Medal (1972)

Masaru Ibuka (井深 大 Ibuka Masaru; April 11, 1908 – December 19, 1997) was a Japanese electronics industrialist and co-founder of Sony, along with Akio Morita.

== Early life ==
Masaru Ibuka was born on April 11, 1908, as the first son of Tasuku Ibuka, an architectural technologist and a student of Inazo Nitobe. His ancestral family were chief retainers of the Aizu Domain, and his relatives include Yae Ibuka and Ibuka Kajinosuke. Masaru lost his father at the age of two and was taken over by his grandfather. He later moved to Kobe after his mother remarried. He passed the entrance exam to Hyogo Prefectural 1st Kobe Boys' School (now, Hyogo Prefectural Kobe High School) and was very happy about this success.

== Career ==
After graduating from Waseda University in 1933, Masaru went to work at Photo-Chemical Laboratory, a company which processed movie film, and later served in the Imperial Japanese Navy during World War II where he was a member of the Imperial Navy Wartime Research Committee. In September 1945, he left the company and navy, and founded a radio repair shop in the bombed out Shirokiya Department Store in Nihonbashi, Tokyo.

In 1946, a fellow wartime researcher, Akio Morita, saw a newspaper article about Ibuka's new venture and after some correspondence, chose to join him in Tokyo. With funding from Morita's father, they co-founded Tokyo Telecommunications Engineering Corporation, which became known as Sony Corporation in 1958. Ibuka was instrumental in securing the licensing of transistor technology from Bell Labs to Sony in the 1950s, thus making Sony one of the first companies to apply transistor technology to non-military uses. He also led the research and development team that developed Sony's Trinitron color television in 1967. Ibuka served as president of Sony from 1950 to 1971, and then served as chairman of Sony from 1971 until he retired in 1976. Ibuka was awarded the Medal of Honor with Blue Ribbon in 1960, and was decorated with the Grand Cordon of the Order of the Sacred Treasure in 1978 and with the Grand Cordon of the Order of the Rising Sun in 1986. He was further decorated as a Commander First Class of the Royal Order of the Polar Star of Sweden in that year, named a Person of Cultural Merit in 1989 and decorated with the Order of Culture in 1992.

The Walkman was first created because Sony co-founder Masaru Ibuka wanted to be able to listen to music on long flights. He asked the company engineers in 1979 to make him a portable music listening device, which engineers accomplished by modifying a portable tape recorder. He like it so much he passed it on the company chairman Akio Morita, who decided to manufacture it.

Ibuka received Honorary Doctorates from Sophia University, Tokyo in 1976, from Waseda University, Tokyo in 1979, and from Brown University (US) in 1994. The IEEE awarded him the IEEE Founders Medal in 1972 and named the IEEE Masaru Ibuka Consumer Electronics Award after him in 1987.

Ibuka served as the Chairman of the National Board of Governors of the Boy Scouts of Nippon. In 1991 the World Organization of the Scout Movement awarded him the Bronze Wolf. In 1989 he also received the highest distinction of the Scout Association of Japan, the Golden Pheasant Award.

Other awards: 1964, Distinguished Services Award from the Institute of Electrical Communication Engineers of Japan; 1981, Humanism and Technology Award from the Aspen Institute for Humanistic Studies; 1986, Eduard Rhein Ring of Honor, German Eduard Rhein Foundation; 1989, Designated Person of Cultural Merits by Ministry of Education; 1991, The Presidential Award and Medallion from the University of Illinois.

Ibuka also authored the book Kindergarten is Too Late (1971), in which he claims that the most significant human learning occurs from birth to 3 years old and suggests ways and means to take advantage of this. The book's foreword was written by Glenn Doman, founder of The Institutes for the Achievement of Human Potential, an organization that teaches parents about child brain development.

== Death ==
Ibuka died of heart failure on December 19, 1997, at age 89. He was survived by a son and two daughters.

Preceded by Tamon Maeda	President of Sony Corporation; 1951–1971	Succeeded by Akio Morita
