= Sony City =

Building in Minato, Tokyo, Japan

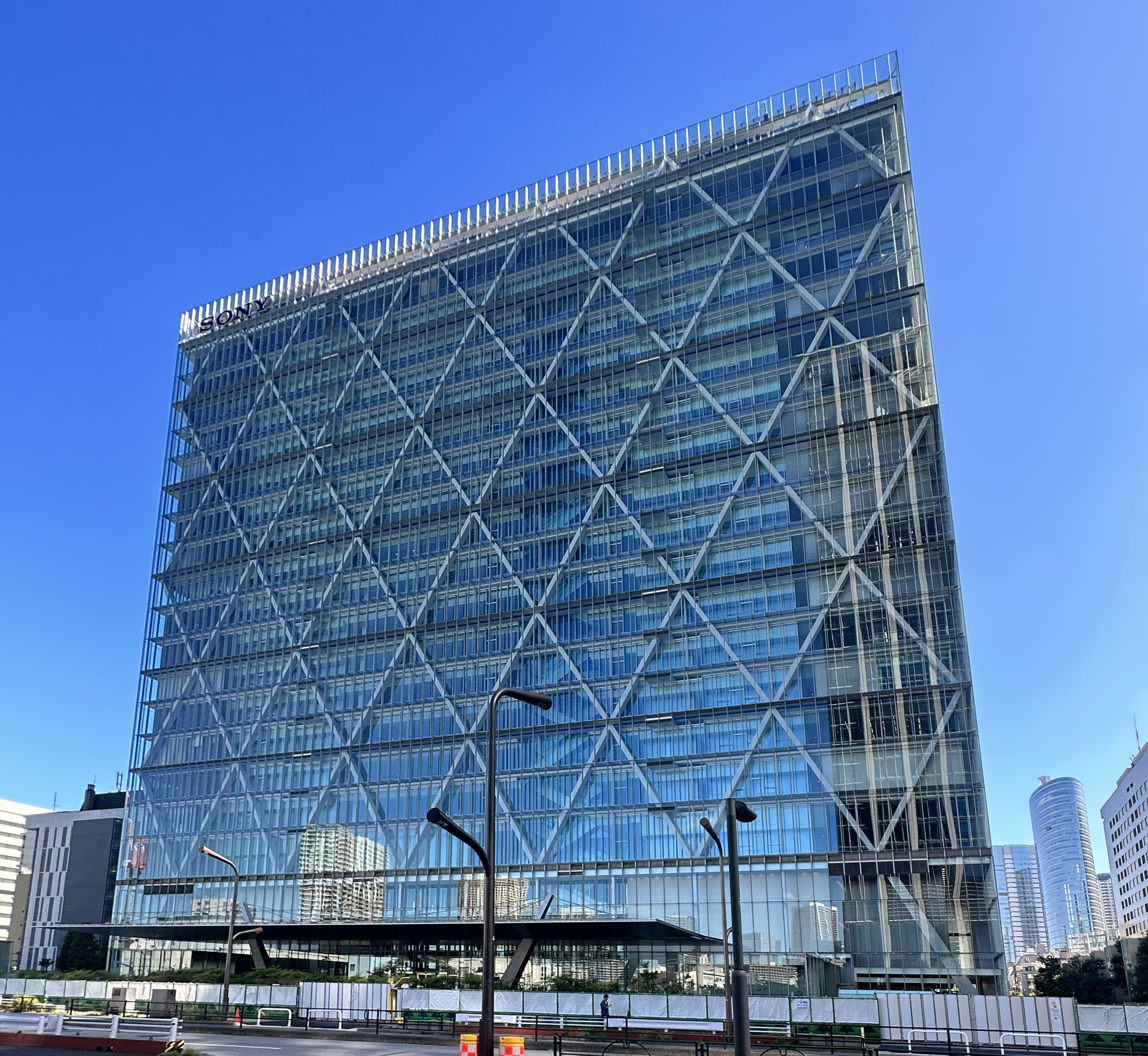
- Sony City, located in Minato, Tokyo, Japan
- Interactive map of the Sony City area

General information
- Location: 1-chōme-7-1 Kōnan, Minato City, Tokyo 108-0075, Japan
- Coordinates: 35°37′52″N 139°44′37″E
- Construction started: 2004
- Completed: 2006
- Owner: Sony

Height
- Top floor: 99.4 m / 326 ft

Technical details
- Floor count: 20

Design and construction
- Architect: Plantec, Inc.
- Known for: Headquarters of Sony

Sony City, also known as the Sony Corporate Office Building, is a high-rise, cube-shaped building that is the global headquarters of Sony, located in Tokyo, Japan. It opened its doors to employees in 2006 and has been used as the headquarters of other companies owned by Sony based in Japan. Sony City, standing at a mere 100 meters tall, is not among the most towering buildings in Tokyo as the city itself is a hub for skyscrapers. However, the Council of Tall Buildings and Urban Habitat has accredited the building for its unique, modern design.

Sony City is equipped with a helipad on its roof, which is a common feature for many tall corporate headquarters in Tokyo. The helipad adds convenience and serves as a practical facility for rapid transportation to and from the building.

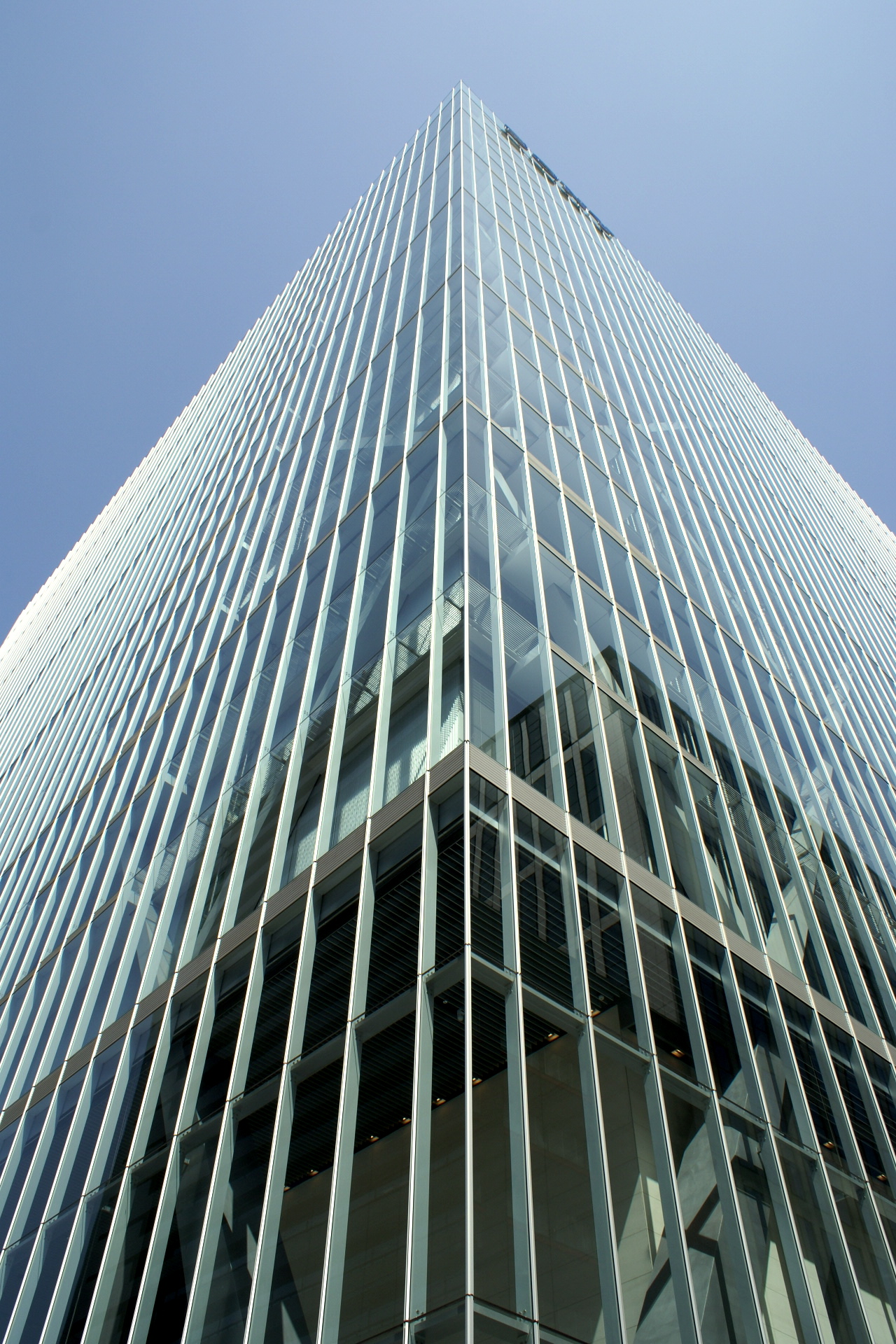
Sony City seen from below

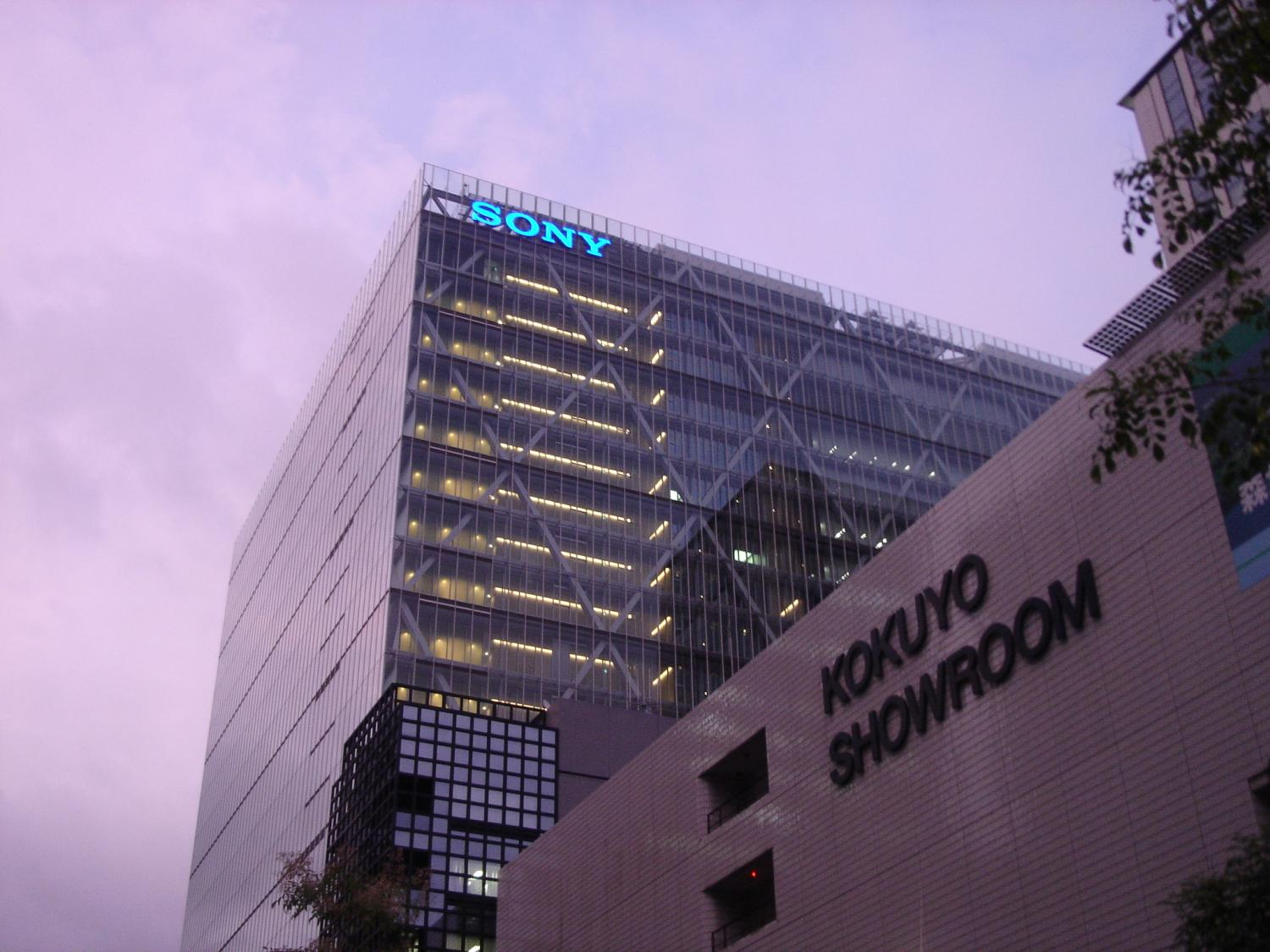
A view of Sony City before night, with the company's logo (in blue) lit up
