= The Japan That Can Say No =

1989 essay by Shintaro Ishihara and Akio Morita

"The Japan That Can Say No: Why Japan Will Be First Among Equals" (「NO」と言える日本, "No" to Ieru Nihon) is a 1989 essay originally co-authored by Shintaro Ishihara, the then Minister of Transport and a leading figure from the Liberal Democratic Party (LDP) who would become governor of Tokyo (1999-2012); and Sony co-founder and chairman Akio Morita, in the climate of Japan's economic rise. It was famous for its critical examination of United States business practices, and for advocating Japan's taking a more independent stance on many issues, from business to foreign affairs.

The title refers to the authors' vision—Ishihara's in particular—of a Japanese government that is more than a mere "yes man" to the United States. Many unauthorized translations were made and circulated in the United States. The authorized 1991 Simon & Schuster English translation by Frank Baldwin (out of print) did not include the essays by Morita. The book caused widespread controversy in the United States, and Morita distanced himself from the book. The book also inspired the similarly themed China Can Say No, a collection of essays published in 1996.

== Points asserted ==
The work alternates between essays written by Ishihara and Morita. The essays were based on various speeches given in the past. In general, Ishihara's essays argue that Japan is a world power to be respected, and that Japanese need to assert themselves more when dealing with the U.S. Morita's essays focus more on the tragic flaws of U.S. companies that will eventually lead to America's decline, and what Japan can do to improve its image and position.

Here is a sampling of points they make:

=== Ishihara's assertions ===
==== Japanese superiority ====
- The world has come to depend on Japanese technology, especially in semiconductor production.
- Japan must use its technological superiority as a negotiating weapon. It should even threaten to trade secrets with the Soviet Union as a bargaining tool against the US and refuse to sell components that go into US missiles.
- The quality of American goods is low because the level of the workers is low, while the superior education of Japanese workers is a big advantage.
- The Japanese character is innately superior to the character of Americans.

==== Japanese assertiveness ====
- Japanese diplomats are not effective in dealing with westerners, so businessmen accustomed to dealing with foreigners should also take part in trade negotiations.
- Japan should end the U.S.-Japan security pact and defend itself, because this would cost less and end reliance on the U.S.

==== Criticisms of America ====
- Americans believe that the Caucasian race is superior since the modern era is dominated by the western world, and this prejudice will hurt them in the end.
- Americans and Christian missionaries try to erase local cultures and replace them with Western culture. (See Cultural imperialism)
- Former American colonies are rife with problems, while former Japanese colonies are thriving.
- America's dropping of the atomic bomb on Japan and not Germany in World War II arose from racism because Germans are white people and Japanese are not.

=== Morita's assertions ===
==== American business ====
- American business focuses too much on money games like mergers and acquisitions, and not enough on creating real goods and manufacturing power.
- American business focuses too much on short-term profits, such as moving manufacturing overseas, while sacrificing long term overall livelihood.
- American company executives receive too much income, which hurts their companies.
- Employees in Japanese companies form a tight community, so overall results are better.
- The trade surplus with the U.S. is caused by the lack of desirable products made in the U.S.
- U.S. businesses are strong in basic research, but not in product development and marketing.
- It is natural for the Japanese government to protect Japanese businesses, as it relies on their tax revenue.

==== Japan's image and position ====
- It is popular to bash Japan, and this is largely the fault of Japanese businessmen overseas who do not socialize with locals and become part of the local community.
- Japanese need to do more to adapt to Western culture and language when dealing with Americans in order to be understood (pointing out that foreigners from other countries have successfully integrated into U.S. society).
- The U.S.'s failure to recognize Japan's importance will hurt the U.S. and the world economy.
- Japan must be conscious of its role as a world leader, and do its part to support the world economy.
- Japan must help build up Asia to strengthen its position as a regional economic leader.
- Japan must give more foreign aid if it wants to be a true world leader. He equates this with doing local community service.

== Reception ==
Daniel W. Drezner of Foreign Policy ranked the book as one of the ten worst books about foreign policy, writing "Shintaro argued that Japan was destined to become the next great superpower. Whoops."

A similar criticism appeared in a March 1990 newspaper, presenting a cartoon of Mount Fuji, symbolic of Japan and its purity, facing an overbearing and militaristic American soldier. Mount Fuji is shown saying "Japan cannot say no," raising the question of whether the postwar period is really over, and suggesting that Japan wants to begin to fend for itself after depending on the US for support during the postwar years.

== See also ==
- Cultural imperialism
- Japanese nationalism
- Foreign relations of Japan
- Foundations of Geopolitics
