= Shintaro Ishihara =

Japanese politician (1932–2022)

Shintarō Ishihara
- 石原 慎太郎
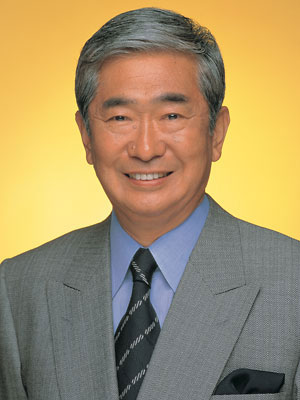
- Official portrait, 2003

Governor of Tokyo
- In office 23 April 1999 – 31 October 2012
- Monarch: Akihito
- Preceded by: Yukio Aoshima
- Succeeded by: Naoki Inose

Minister of Transport
- In office 6 November 1987 – 27 November 1988
- Prime Minister: Noboru Takeshita
- Preceded by: Ryūtarō Hashimoto
- Succeeded by: Shinji Satō

Director-General of the Environmental Agency
- In office 24 December 1976 – 28 November 1977
- Prime Minister: Takeo Fukuda
- Preceded by: Shigesada Marumo
- Succeeded by: Hisanari Yamada

Member of the House of Representatives
- In office 11 December 2012 – 21 November 2014
- Preceded by: Ichirō Kamoshita
- Succeeded by: Akihisa Nagashima
- Constituency: Tokyo PR
- In office 10 December 1976 – 14 April 1995
- Preceded by: Himself (1975)
- Succeeded by: Constituency abolished (1996)
- Constituency: Tokyo 2nd
- In office 10 December 1972 – 18 March 1975
- Preceded by: Yoshirō Kikuchi
- Succeeded by: Himself (1976)
- Constituency: Tokyo 2nd

Member of the House of Councillors
- In office 8 July 1968 – 25 November 1972
- Constituency: National district

Personal details
- Born: 30 September 1932 Suma-ku, Kobe, Japan
- Died: 1 February 2022 (aged 89) Ōta, Tokyo, Japan
- Party: Independent (1973–1976; 1995–2012)
- Other political affiliations: LDP (1968–1973; 1976–1995); Sunrise (2012); JRP (2012–2014); PFG (2014–2015)
- Spouse: Noriko Ishihara (m. 1955)
- Children: Nobuteru; Hirotaka; Yoshizumi; Nobuhiro
- Relatives: Yūjirō Ishihara (brother); Mie Ishihara (sister-in-law); Risa Ishihara (daughter-in-law)
- Education: Hitotsubashi University
- Profession: Novelist and author

Shintaro Ishihara (石原 慎太郎, Ishihara Shintarō; 30 September 1932 – 1 February 2022) was a Japanese politician and writer, who served as the Governor of Tokyo from 1999 to 2012. Being the former leader of the radical right Sunrise Party, later merged with Toru Hashimoto's Japan Restoration Party out of which he split his faction into the Party for Japanese Kokoro, he was one of the most prominent ultranationalists in modern Japanese politics. Ishihara was criticized for his misogynistic comments, his xenophobic views, and his racist remarks against Chinese and Koreans in Japan, including his use of the antiquated pejorative term "sangokujin".

A critic of relations between Japan and the United States, his artistic accomplishments included his authorship of a prize-winning novel, his authorship of best-sellers, and his work in theater, film, and journalism. His 1989 book, The Japan That Can Say No, co-authored with Sony chairman Akio Morita (published in English in 1991), called on the authors' countrymen to stand up to the United States.

After an early career as a writer and a film director, Ishihara served as in the House of Councillors from 1968 to 1972, then he served as in the House of Representatives from 1972 to 1995, just four years before he served as Governor of Tokyo from 1999 to 2012. He resigned from the governorship to briefly co-lead the Sunrise Party, before he joined the Japan Restoration Party upon his return to the House of Representatives in the 2012 general election. He unsuccessfully sought re-election in the general election of November 2014, and officially left politics the following month.

In October 2021, Ishihara was diagnosed with pancreatic cancer, while his wife Noriko had ruptured aortic aneurysm, and given only three months to live amid a routine physical exam. Ishihara died from its complications on 1 February 2022, at the age of 89.

== Early life and artistic career ==
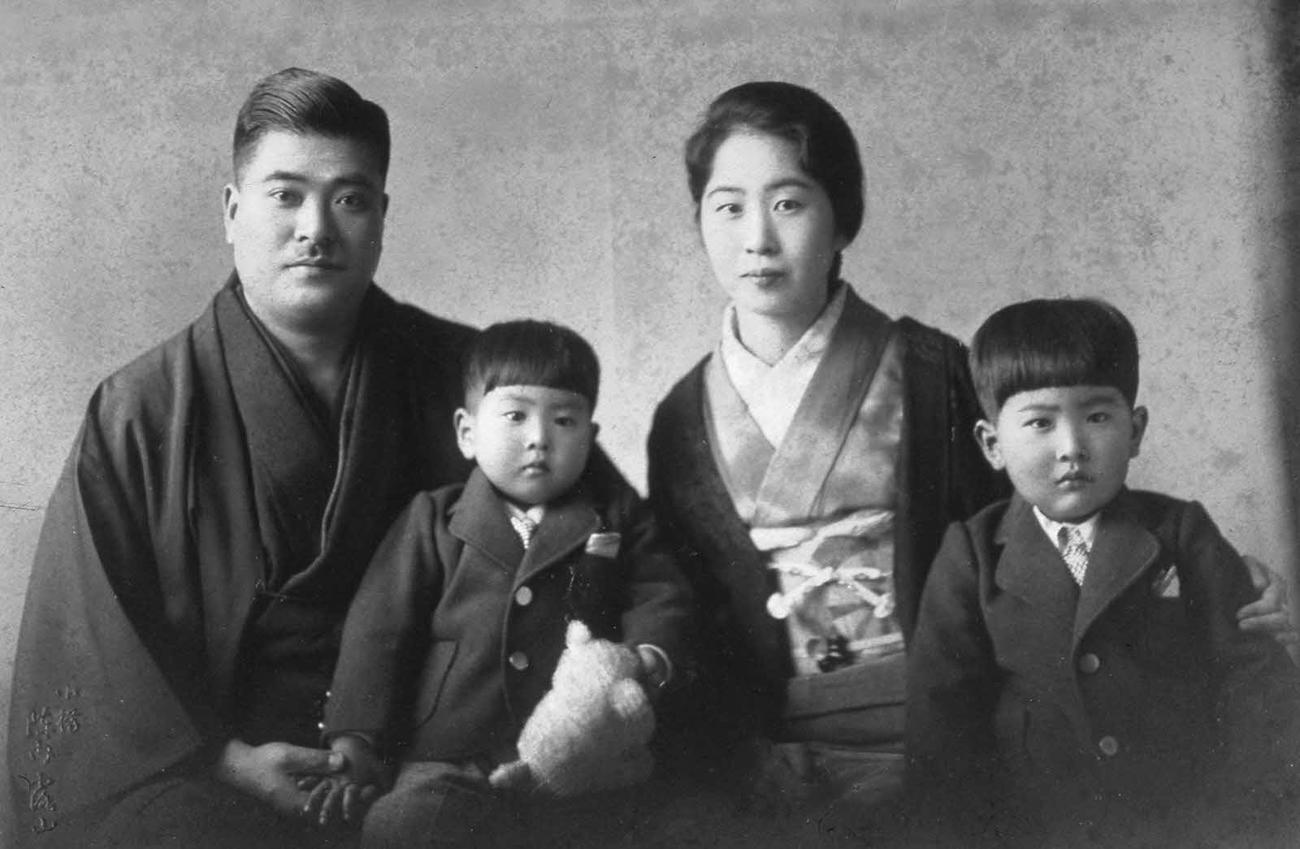
Ishihara family; from left to right: Kiyoshi (father), Yūjirō (youngest brother), Mitsuko (mother), and Shintaro

Shintaro Ishihara was born on 30 September 1932 in Suma-ku, Kobe. His father, Kiyoshi Ishihara (1899–1951), was an employee and later a general manager of a shipping company, and his mother, Mitsuko Ishihara (1907–1992), was a daughter of Sannosuke Kato from Hiroshima. He grew up in Zushi, Kanagawa, parts of Greater Tokyo Area. In 1952, Ishihara entered Hitotsubashi University, and he graduated in 1956. Just two months before graduation, Ishihara won the Akutagawa Prize (Japan's most prestigious literary prize) for the novel Season of the Sun. His brother Yujiro played a supporting role in the movie adaptation of the novel, for which Shintaro wrote the screenplay. Ishihara had dabbled in directing a couple of films starring his brother. Regarding these early years as a filmmaker, he said to a Playboy Magazine interviewer in 1990 that "If I had remained a movie director, I can assure you that I would have at least become a better one than Akira Kurosawa".

In the early 1960s, he concentrated on writing, including plays, novels, and a musical version of Treasure Island. One of his later novels, Lost Country (1982), speculated about Japan under the control of the Soviet Union. He also ran a theatre company, and found time to visit the North Pole, race his yacht The Contessa, and cross South America on a motorcycle. He wrote a memoir of his journey, Nanbei Odan Ichiman Kiro.

From 1966 to 1967, he covered the Vietnam War at the request of Yomiuri Shimbun, and the experience influenced his decision to enter politics. He also was mentored by the influential author and political "fixer" Tsûsai Sugawara.

== Political career ==
In 1968, Ishihara ran as a candidate on the Liberal Democratic Party (LDP) national slate for the House of Councillors. He placed first on the LDP list with an unprecedented 3 million votes. After four years in the upper house, Ishihara ran for the House of Representatives representing the second district of Tokyo, and again won election.

In 1973, he joined with thirty other LDP lawmakers in the anti-communist Seirankai or "Blue Storm Group"; the group gained notoriety for sealing a pledge of unity in their own blood.

Ishihara ran for Governor of Tokyo in 1975, but lost to the popular Socialist incumbent Ryokichi Minobe. Minobe was 71 at the time, and Ishihara criticized him as being "too old".

Ishihara returned to the House of Representatives afterward, and worked his way up the party's internal ladder, serving as Director-General of the Environment Agency under Takeo Fukuda (1976) and Minister of Transport under Noboru Takeshita (1989). During the 1980s, Ishihara was a highly visible and popular LDP figure, but was unable to win enough internal support to form a true faction and move up the national political ladder. In 1983, his campaign manager put up stickers throughout Tokyo stating that Ishihara's political opponent was an defector from North Korea. Ishihara denied that this was discrimination, saying that the public had a right to know.

In 1989, shortly after losing a highly contested race for the party presidency, Ishihara came to the attention of the West through his book The Japan That Can Say No, co-authored with Sony chairman Akio Morita. The book called on his fellow countrymen to stand up to America.

=== Governor of Tokyo ===
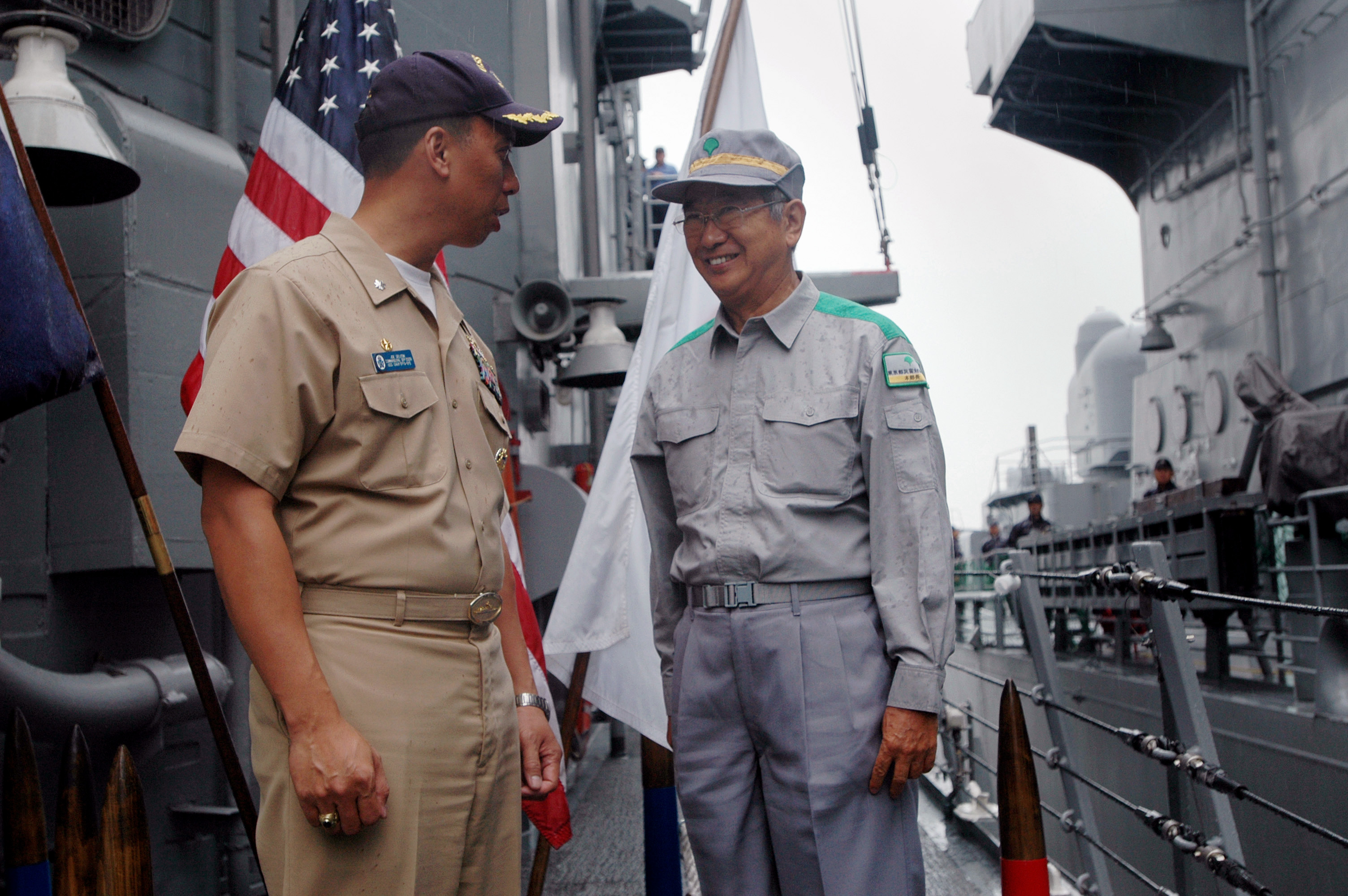
Tokyo Governor Shintaro Ishihara and U.S. Navy Commander Joseph Deleon at the Emergency Drill in Yokosuka, Kanagawa Prefecture, Japan, in September 2006

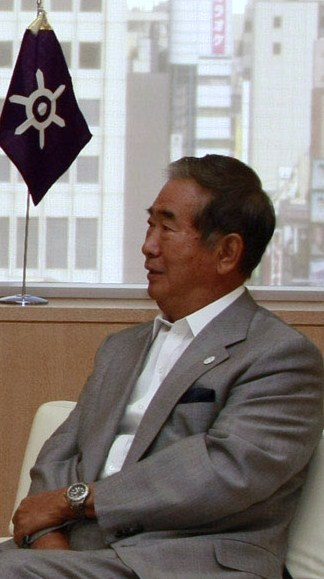
Ishihara at the Tokyo Governor's office (2009)

In the 1999 Tokyo gubernatorial election, he ran on an independent platform and was elected as Governor of Tokyo. Among Ishihara's moves as governor, he:

- Cut metropolitan spending projects, including plans for a new Toei Subway line, and proposed the sale or leasing out of many metropolitan facilities.
- Imposed a new tax on banks' gross profits (rather than net profits).
- Imposed a new hotel tax based on occupancy.
- Imposed restrictions on the operation of diesel-powered vehicles, following a highly publicized event where he held up a bottle of diesel soot before cameras and reporters.
- Imposed cap and trade energy tax.
- Proposed opening casinos in the Odaiba district.
- Declared in 2005 that Tokyo would bid for the 2016 Summer Olympics, which discouraged a bid by Fukuoka. Tokyo's bid lost to that of Rio de Janeiro.
- Set up the ShinGinko Tokyo bank to lend to SMEs (small medium enterprises) in Tokyo. The project came under criticism - according to The Times, the bank had lost approximately 1 billion dollars' worth of taxpayers' money through inadequate customer risk assessments.
- Served as Chairman of Tokyo's successful bid to host the 2020 Summer Olympics.
- Generated controversy from PETA for the culling of the 37,000 crows that populated Tokyo.

He won re-election in 2003 with 70.2% of the vote, and re-election in 2007 with 50.52% of the vote. In the 2011 gubernatorial election, his share of the vote dipped to 43.4% against challenges by comedian Hideo Higashikokubaru and entrepreneur Miki Watanabe.

On 25 October 2012, Ishihara announced he would resign as Governor of Tokyo to form a new political party in preparation for upcoming national elections. Following his announcement, the Tokyo Metropolitan Assembly approved his resignation on 31 October 2012, officially ending his tenure as Governor of Tokyo for 4,941 days, the second-longest term after Shunichi Suzuki.

=== Sunrise Party ===
Ishihara's new national party was expected to be formed with members of the right-wing Sunrise Party of Japan, which he had helped to set up in 2010. When announced by co-leaders Ishihara and SPJ chief Takeo Hiranuma on 13 November 2012, Sunrise Party incorporated all five members of SPJ. SP would look to form a coalition with other small parties including Osaka Mayor Toru Hashimoto's Japan Restoration Party (Nippon Ishin no Kai).

In November 2012, Ishihara and his co-leader Hiranuma said that the Sunrise Party would pursue "establishment of an independent Constitution, beefing up of Japan's defense capabilities, and fundamental reform of fiscal management and tax systems to make them more transparent". The future of nuclear power and the upcoming consumption tax hike were issues it would have to address with potential coalition partners.

=== Sunrise Party merger with the Japan Restoration Party ===
Only four days after the Sunrise Party was launched, on 17 November 2012, Ishihara and Tōru Hashimoto, leader of the Japan Restoration Party (JRP), decided to merge their parties, with Ishihara becoming the head of the JRP. Your Party would not join the party, nor would Genzei Nippon, as the latter party's anti-consumption tax increase policy did not match the JRP's pro-consumption tax policy.

Reporting on a poll in early December 2012, Asahi Shimbun characterized the merger with Japan Restoration Party as the latter having "swallowed up" Sunrise. The poll, in advance of the 16 December Lower House elections, also said the association with SP could hurt JRP's chances of forming a ruling coalition even though JRP was showing strength relative to the ruling DPJ.

=== Party for Future Generations ===
In December 2014 general elections, he was a candidate for the Party for Future Generations, a far-right party, but he was defeated. Following this, he retired from politics.

== Political views ==
Ishihara is generally described as having been one of Japan's most prominent extreme right-wing politicians. He was called "Japan's [Jean-Marie] Le Pen" on a program broadcast on Australia's ABC. He was affiliated with the openly ultranationalist organization Nippon Kaigi.

=== Foreign relations ===
Ishihara was a long-term friend of the prominent Aquino family in the Philippines. He is credited with being the first person to inform future President Corazon Aquino about the assassination of her husband Ninoy Aquino, a former senator and exiled critic of Ferdinand Marcos, on 21 August 1983.

Ishihara was often critical of Japan's foreign policy as being non-assertive. Regarding Japan's relationship with the U.S., he stated that "The country I dislike most in terms of U.S.–Japan ties is Japan, because it's a country that can't assert itself." As part of the criticism, Ishihara published a book co-authored with the then Prime minister of Malaysia, Mahathir Mohamad, titled "No" to ieru Ajia – tai Oubei e no hōsaku in 1994.

Ishihara was also long critical of the communist government of the People's Republic of China. He invited the Dalai Lama and the President of Taiwan Lee Teng-hui to Tokyo.

Ishihara was deeply interested in the North Korean abduction issue, and called for economic sanctions against North Korea. Following Ishihara's campaign to bid Tokyo for the 2016 Summer Olympics, he eased his criticism of the PRC government. He accepted an invitation to attend the 2008 Summer Olympics in Beijing, and was selected as a torch-bearer for the Japan leg of the 2008 Summer Olympics torch relay.

=== Views on foreigners in Japan ===
On 9 April 2000, in a speech before a Self-Defense Forces group, Ishihara said crimes were repeatedly committed by illegally entered people, using the pejorative term sangokujin, and foreigners. He also speculated that in the event a natural disaster struck the Tokyo area, they would be likely to cause civil disorder. His comment invoked calls for his resignation, demands for an apology and fears among residents of Korean descent in Japan, as well as being criticised by the UN Committee on the Elimination of Racial Discrimination.

Regarding this statement, Ishihara later said:

I referred to the "many sangokujin who entered Japan illegally." I thought some people would not know that word so I paraphrased it and used gaikokujin, or foreigners. But it was a newspaper holiday so the news agencies consciously picked up the sangokujin part, causing the problem.

... After World War II, when Japan lost, the Chinese of Taiwanese origin and people from the Korean Peninsula persecuted, robbed and sometimes beat up Japanese. It's at that time the word was used, so it was not derogatory. Rather we were afraid of them.

... There's no need for an apology. I was surprised that there was a big reaction to my speech. In order not to cause any misunderstanding, I decided I will no longer use that word. It is regrettable that the word was interpreted in the way it was.

On 20 February 2006, Ishihara also said: "Roppongi is now virtually a foreign neighborhood. Africans—I don't mean African Americans—who don't speak English are there doing who knows what. This is leading to new forms of crime such as car theft. We should be letting in people who are intelligent."

On 17 April 2010, Ishihara said "many veteran lawmakers in the ruling-coalition parties are naturalized or the offspring of people naturalized in Japan".

=== Other controversial statements ===
In 1990, Ishihara said in a Playboy interview that the Rape of Nanjing was a fiction, claiming, "People say that the Japanese made a holocaust but that is not true. It is a story made up by the Chinese. It has tarnished the image of Japan, but it is a lie." He continued to defend this statement in the uproar that ensued. He also backed the film The Truth about Nanjing, a Japanese film that denies the atrocity, framing it as Chinese communist propaganda.

In 2000, Ishihara, one of the eight judges for a literary prize, commented that homosexuality is abnormal, which caused an outrage in the gay community in Japan.

In a 2001 interview with women's magazine Shukan Josei, Ishihara said that he believed "old women who live after they have lost their reproductive function are useless and are committing a sin", adding that he "couldn't say this as a politician." He was criticized in the Tokyo Metropolitan Assembly for these comments, but responded that the criticism was driven by "tyrant... old women."

During an inauguration of a university building in 2004, Ishihara stated that French is unqualified as an international language because it is "a language in which nobody can count", referring to the counting system in French, which is based on units of twenty for numbers from 70 to 99 rather than ten (as is the case in Japanese and English). The statement led to a lawsuit from several language schools in 2005. Ishihara subsequently responded to comments that he did not disrespect French culture by professing his love of French literature on Japanese TV news.

At a Tokyo IOC press briefing in 2009, Governor Ishihara dismissed a letter sent by environmentalist Paul Coleman regarding the contradiction of his promoting the Tokyo Olympic 2016 bid as 'the greenest ever' while destroying the forested mountain of Minamiyama, the closest 'Satoyama' to the centre of Tokyo, by angrily stating Coleman was 'Just a foreigner, it does not matter'. Then, on continued questioning by investigative journalist Hajime Yokota, he stated 'Minamiyama is a Devil's Mountain that eats children.' Then he went on to explain how unmanaged forests 'eat children' and implied that Yokota, a Japanese national, was betraying his nation by saying 'What nationality are you anyway?' This was recorded on film and turned into a video that was sent around the world as the Save Minamiyama Movement.

In 2010, Ishihara claimed that Korea under Japanese rule was absolutely justified due to historical pressures from Qing dynasty and Imperial Russia.

In reference to the Great East Japan earthquake and tsunami and the subsequent Fukushima nuclear disaster, which claimed the lives of 20,000 people, Ishihara said that "the triple disaster was 'divine punishment from heaven', because Japanese people have become a greedy":

America's identity is freedom. Japan has no sense of that. Only responsible, material, and monetary greed. For many years, in the heart of Japanese people, who had always bounded with devil. This greed bounds with populism. Japanese people's identity is greed. These things need to be washed away from triple disaster. I think this is a divine punishment from heaven.

— Ishihara Shintaro

However, he also commented that the victims of triple disaster in Japan were pitiable.

This speech was quickly caused many controversies and critical responses from the public opinion, both inside and outside Japan. The governor of Miyagi expressed displeasure about Ishihara's speech amid Akihito's response the victims of triple disaster in Japan. Ishihara later apologized for these comments.

During the 2012 Summer Olympics, Ishihara stated that "Westerners practicing judo resembles beasts fighting. Internationalized judo has lost its appeal." He added, "In Brazil they put chocolate in norimaki, but I wouldn't call it sushi. Judo has gone the same way."

Ishihara has said that Japan ought to have nuclear weapons.

==== Proposal to buy the Senkaku Islands ====
On 15 April 2012, Ishihara made a speech in Washington, D.C., publicly stating his desire for Tokyo to purchase the Senkaku Islands, called the Diaoyu Islands by mainland China and Diaoyutai Islands in Taiwan, on behalf of Japan in an attempt to end the territorial dispute between China and Japan, causing uproars in Chinese society and increasing tension between the governments of China and Japan. The government of Japan bought the islands in an effort to preempt the provocative bid, although the Chinese side viewed the purchase as an effort by Japan to bring the islands under Japanese sovereignty.

== Personal life ==
Ishihara married to Japanese essayist, Noriko Ishihara (石原典子, b. 1 January between 1933 and/or 1938 (Note: 1933 or 1938 are most commonly cited as the year of her birth, though sources range from 1933 to 1938. Some sources inaccurately cite the date as 1 January 1933. At the time of her death on 8 March 2022, her son, Nobuteru stated that she was 84 or 89, which also places her birth in 1933 or 1938 (1933 if born in January).) – d. 8 March 2022) (formerly real name as Yumiko Ishida), a Hiroshima bombing survivor. The couple have four sons: Nobuteru (born 19 April 1957), a politician; Yoshizumi (born 15 January 1962), an actor and weatherman; Hirotaka (born 19 June 1964), a politician; and Nobuhiro (born 22 August 1966), a painter and artist.

His younger brother, Yujiro Ishihara (1934–1987) was an actor and singer; his sister-in-law, Mie Ishihara (born 1933) was an actress; and his daughter-in-law, Risa Ishihara (born 1 August 1963), was an actress and woman talent.

== Illness and death ==
In October 2021, Ishihara was diagnosed with pancreatic cancer and given only three months to live. As Ishihara wanted to spend his last days at home without feeling pain, according to his son, Nobuteru, who asked a doctor specializing in terminal care to prescribe him painkilling medication. His wife, Noriko, was also unwell due to ruptured aortic aneurysm.

The couple's four sons and one daughter-in-law spent New Year's Day and other holidays at the house on a rotating basis with a resident nanny. Shintaro repeatedly told his son, Nobuteru, "Dying and boring", and "Please take care of everything else", as he wrote manuscripts on his sickbed.

Ishihara died at his home in Tokyo on 1 February 2022, at aged 89. About a month later on 8 March of the same year, his wife, Noriko had collapsed and died at aged 84. According to statements by his family and Japanese Ministry of Health, Labor, and Welfare, in both cases the cause of death was unrelated to Fukushima disaster and COVID-19 infection. Both of their bodies were cremated after their private funerals, and both of ashes were scattered at the sea.

They were survived by four sons, Nobuteru, Hirotaka, Yoshizumi, and Nobuhiro; and a daughter-in-law, Risa.

== Books written by Ishihara ==
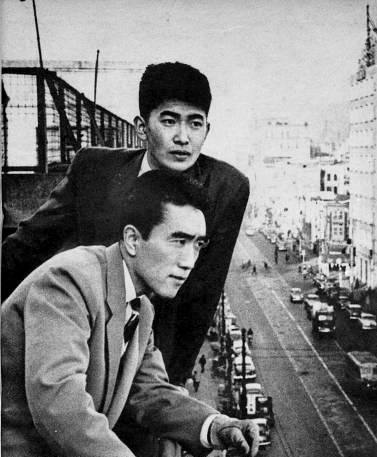
Shintaro Ishihara (upper) and Yukio Mishima (lower) in 1956 at the Bungeishunjū Building

- Taiyō no kisetsu (太陽の季節), Season of the Sun, Winner of the Akutagawa Prize, 1956
- Kurutta kajitsu (狂った果実), Crazed Fruit, 1956
- Kanzen Na Yuugi (完全な遊戯), The Perfect Game, 1956
- Umi no chizu (海の地図), Map of the Sea, 1958
- Seinen no ki (青年の樹), Tree of the Youth, 1959
- Gesshoku (月蝕), Lunar Eclipse, 1959
- Nanbei ōdan ichi man kiro (南米横断1万キロ), 10 Thousand Kilometers Motoring across South America
- Seishun to wa nanda (青春とはなんだ), What does Youth Mean?, 1965
- Ōinaru umi e (大いなる海へ), To the Great Sea, 1965
- Kaeranu umi (還らぬ海), Unretreating Sea, 1966
- Suparuta kyōiku (スパルタ教育), Spartan education, 1969
- Kaseki no mori (化石の森), Petrified Forest, Minister of Education Prize, 1970
- Shintarō no seiji chousho (慎太郎の政治調書), Shintaro's Political Record, 1970
- Shintarō no daini seiji chousho (慎太郎の第二政治調書), Shintaro's Second Political Record, 1971
- Shin Wakan rōeishū (新和漢朗詠集), New Wakan rōeishū (Collection of Japanese and Chinese poems), 1973
- Yabanjin no daigaku (野蛮人の大学), University of Barbarians, 1977
- Boukoku -Nihon no totsuzenshi (亡国 -日本の突然死), The Ruin of a Nation - Japan's Sudden Death, 1982
- 'Nō' to ieru Nihon (「NO」と言える日本), The Japan That Can Say No (in collaboration with Akio Morita), 1989
- Soredemo 'Nō' to ieru Nihon. Nichibeikan no konponmondai (それでも「NO」と言える日本 —日米間の根本問題—), The Japan That Still Can Say No - Principal problem of the Japan–US relations (in collaboration with Shōichi Watanabe and Kazuhisa Ogawa), 1990
- Waga jinsei no toki no toki (わが人生の時の時), The Sublime Moment of my Life, 1990
- Danko 'No' to ieru Nihon (断固「NO」と言える日本), The Japan That Can Strongly Say No (in collaboration with Jun Etō), 1991
- Mishima Yukio no nisshoku (三島由紀夫の日蝕), The Eclipse of Yukio Mishima, 1991
- 'No' to ieru Asia (「NO」と言えるアジア)，The Asia That Can Say NO (in collaboration with Mahathir Mohamad), 1994
- Kaze ni tsuite no kioku (風についての記憶), My Memory about the Wind, 1994
- Otōto (弟), Younger brother, Mainichi Publishing Culture Award Special Award, 1996
- 'Chichi' nakushite kuni tatazu ("父"なくして国立たず), No Country can Stand without "Father", 1997
- Sensen fukoku 'Nō' to ieru Nihon keizai -Amerika no kin'yū dorei kara no kaihō- (宣戦布告「NO」と言える日本経済 —アメリカの金融奴隷からの解放—), Declaration of War, Economy of Japan That Can Say No - Liberation from America's financial slavery, 1998
- Hokekyō o ikiru(法華経を生きる), To Live the Lotus Sutra, 1998
- Seisan (聖餐), Eucharist, 1999
- Kokka naru gen'ei (国家なる幻影), An Illusion called Nation, 1999
- Amerika shinkō wo suteyo 2001 nen kara no nihon senryaku (「アメリカ信仰」を捨てよ —2001年からの日本戦略), Stop worshipping America - Japan strategy from 2001, 2000
- Boku wa kekkon shinai (僕は結婚しない), I Won't Marry, 2001
- Ima 'Tamashii' no kyōiku (いま「魂」の教育), Now, 'Spirit' Education, 2001
- Ei'en nare, nihon -moto sōri to tochiji no katariai (永遠なれ、日本 -元総理と都知事の語り合い), Japan Forever – A Talk between Ex-Premier and Tokyo governor (in collaboration with Yasuhiro Nakasone), 2001
- Oite koso jinsei (老いてこそ人生), To get Old is the Life, 2002
- Hi no shima (火の島), Island of Fire, 2008
- Watashi no suki na nihonjin (私の好きな日本人), My Favorite Japanese People, 2008
- Saisei(再生), Recovery, 2010
- Shin Darakuron -Gayoku to tenbatsu (新・堕落論-我欲と天罰),New "On Decadance" - Greed and Divine Punishment, 2011

=== Translation work ===
- Robert Ringer: Winning Through Intimidation, 1978

=== Translations in English ===
- The Japan That Can Say No (in collaboration with Akio Morita), Simon & Schuster, 1991, ISBN 0-671-72686-2. Touchstone Books, 1992, ISBN 0-671-75853-5. Cassette version ISBN 0-671-73571-3. Disk version, 1993, ISBN 1-882690-23-0.

== Film career ==
He acted in six films, including Crazed Fruit (1956) and The Hole (1957), and co-directed the 1962 film Love at Twenty (with François Truffaut, Marcel Ophüls, Renzo Rossellini and Andrzej Wajda). He wrote the story for films such as Pale Flower (1964).

== Allusions in film ==
Ishihara served as a model for the character of Shinsaburô Ishiyama, a fictional Japanese Minister of Defence, invariably replying No! to all foreign requests, in the 2006 satiric comedy Nihon Igai Zenbu Chinbotsu.

== Honours ==
- Akutagawa Prize (1956)
- Grand Cordon of the Order of the Rising Sun (2015)

== See also ==
- Racism in Japan
- Ultranationalism in Japan

== Notes ==
Political offices
Preceded by Shigesada Marumo	Director General of the Environment Agency; 1976–1977	Succeeded by Hisanari Yamada
Preceded by Ryutaro Hashimoto	Minister for Transport; 1987–1988	Succeeded by Shinji Sato
Preceded by Yukio Aoshima	Governor of Tokyo; 1999–2012	Succeeded by Naoki Inose
Honorary titles
Preceded by Tetsuo Kutsukake	Oldest member of the House of Representatives of Japan; 2012–2014	Succeeded by Shizuka Kamei
