= Shirokiya =

Japanese department store chain

Shirokiya Holdings LLC
- Type: Private
- Industry: retail
- Founded: 1662 (364 years ago) in Tokyo, Japan
- Headquarters: Honolulu, Hawaii
- Number of locations: 1
- Key people: Hikotaro Omura, founder Koji Hayashi, President and CEO; Walter Watanabe, Board of director and Store Manager
- Products: various
- Revenue: $38 million (January 1, 2005)

Shirokiya (白木屋) was a chain of department stores and other retail establishments founded in Japan and later located in Honolulu under the ownership of Shirokiya Holdings, LLC, a United States-based corporation. The company's last location closed in 2020.

== Company overview ==
Shirokiya, Inc. (the store) is overseen by a seven-person board, all of whom own a part of Shirokiya's parent company, Shirokiya Holdings, LLC. The CEO and President is Japanese native Koji Hayashi, who also oversees the few functions of the company that still remain in Japan. Director and Store Manager Walter Watanabe, as well as the remaining directors, oversee the bulk of the operations, also serving as store senior management.

== History ==
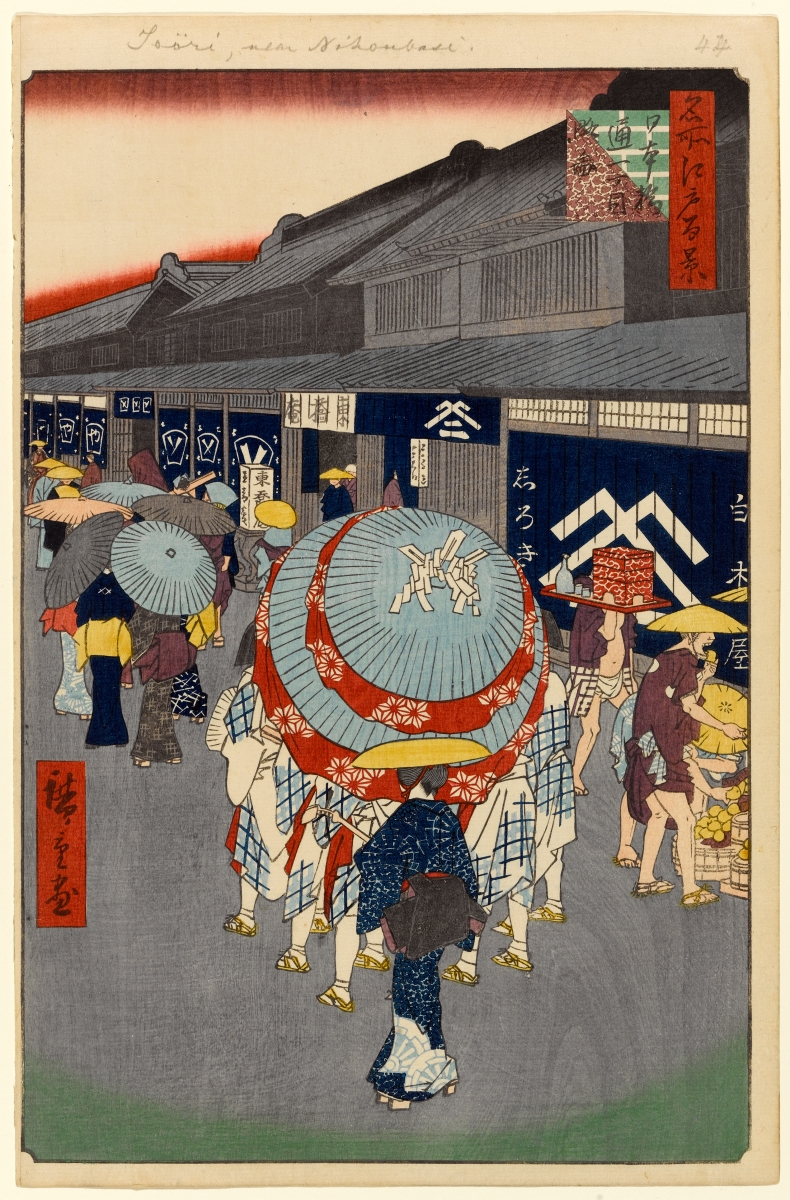
Shirokiya (back right) in Edo (now Tokyo) circa 1850; drawn by Hiroshige. Note the logo on the front curtain

Hikotaro Omura opened a dry goods store at Nihonbashi in Edo, (now Tokyo) in August 1662. Omura called the store Shirokiya Gofukuten, a name that would last until the 20th century. Over the next few hundred years, the store slowly expanded, and as Japan entered the Meiji era, Shirokiya and its main rival at the time, Mitsukoshi, expanded into selling clothing and other goods in 1886. In 1903, Shirokiya opened a western-style department store, followed by the creation of a larger store down the street eight years later.

The turning point for Shirokiya was a series of natural, financial and man-made disasters that devastated the company's fortunes. The first was the Tokyo earthquake of 1923 that completely destroyed the original department store building (it was then reconstructed using modern architecture). This was followed a few years later by a major fire on December 16, 1932, which destroyed the larger building and caused 14 fatalities. Finally, Shirokiya's assets, centered mainly in Tokyo, were devastated during World War II and the subsequent occupation of Japan, whereas Mitsukoshi, spread throughout the nation, fared better.

By 1958, Shirokiya was clearly on the downturn; despite the use of innovative marketing techniques common in the west but unheard of in Japan, Mitsukoshi continued to have a commanding lead in Japan's retail industry.

=== Tokyu era ===
In 1958, in order to protect itself from a hostile takeover, Shirokiya agreed to be absorbed into the Tokyu Group, a railway company expanding into the retail industry at that time. In a move to unite all Japanese stores under the Tokyu Department Store chain, the Shirokiya brand progressively disappeared from Japanese life, culminating with the renaming of the Nihonbashi site in 1967.

However, the fusion with Tokyu also resulted in an overseas expansion using the Shirokiya branding. On October 29, 1959, the first branch of Shirokiya outside Japan opened in Hawaii's then brand-new Ala Moana Center. In 1966 the department store moved to a different location in Ala Moana across from Liberty House (now Macy's) where it would remain for 50 years. A branch store was opened in Maui in November 1973. A second branch was opened up at Pearlridge, near Pearl Harbor, on April 2, 1981.

Though the three stores were popular with both local residents and tourists, the stores had an uneven profit record. By the 1990s, as Japan entered a recession, the Tokyu Group went heavily into debt. By 2001, the company was already $470 million in debt, and in 1999, it was forced to close its 330-year-old flagship location in Nihonbashi. In order to further cut costs, Tokyu began to shed its overseas businesses, either selling them off or closing them outright. Eventually, attention turned to the Shirokiya stores, with the Pearlridge store closing in March 2001 and the Maui store shuttering in May of that same year.

Customer outcry was immense. Led by Senator Daniel Inouye, a petition signed by 30,000 residents of Hawaii and Japan was sent to Tokyu, in the hopes that Tokyu would find a fitting end to the "Shirokiya crisis". News reports both in Japan and Hawaii began to report that Tokyu would simply close all of its retail outlets and sell off its other properties and focus only on its Japanese businesses. This was compounded when Tokyu declined to renegotiate its leases for all the stores.

=== Modern era ===
In a surprise move, Tokyu opted to sell the Shirokiya company to the seven highest-ranking executives of the Hawaiian store for the amount of $1, taking a $23 million loss. The deal, which included the rights to build a future expansion at Tokyu's lone remaining Hawaii asset, the Shirokiya Department Store at Ala Moana Center, ensured the survival of Shirokiya, though there were some reports in the Japanese media about the loss of one of Japan's oldest companies to the U.S.

The newly formed Shirokiya Holdings acted immediately, streamlining operations and assets, and renegotiating the lease on the remaining store. On November 17, 2002, Shirokiya reopened its doors, with then-Governor Benjamin J. Cayetano declaring the day to be "Shirokiya Day". The following year, on July 14, 2003, Shirokiya Holdings reported net sales of $35 million.

On March 31, 2016, Shirokiya closed its Ala Moana Center department store location, and on June 25, 2016, opened the Shirokiya Japan Village Walk at a street-level location in the newly constructed Ewa wing of Ala Moana. The Japan Village Walk was a food hall themed after the shopping alleys of old Kyoto and consisted of over fifty vendors in four areas: Yataimura (food court & beer garden), Zeppin Plaza (shopping alleys), Omatsuri Hiroba (festival and event square) and Guardian Spirits Sanctuary (good luck deities). Part of the former Shirokiya department store space was converted into another Ala Moana Center food court called "The Lanai."

Shirokiya's Japan Village Walk and its adjacent Vintage Cave restaurant closed in March 2020 due to the COVID-19 pandemic. In 2021, Ala Moana's parent company sued Shirokiya Holdings Inc. over almost $8 million in back rent for its locations which had never reopened following the 2020 closure. Shirokiya countersued claiming that Ala Moana had illegally terminated its leases and had not given the company opportunity to succeed due to pandemic closures and the move to the new location. Following a legal battle over access to equipment and property left in the shuttered locations, mediation attempts failed in November 2021. After remaining closed for several years, the former Village Walk location was redeveloped as a Dave & Buster's restaurant which opened on April 14, 2025.
