= Sexual dimorphism in human physiology =

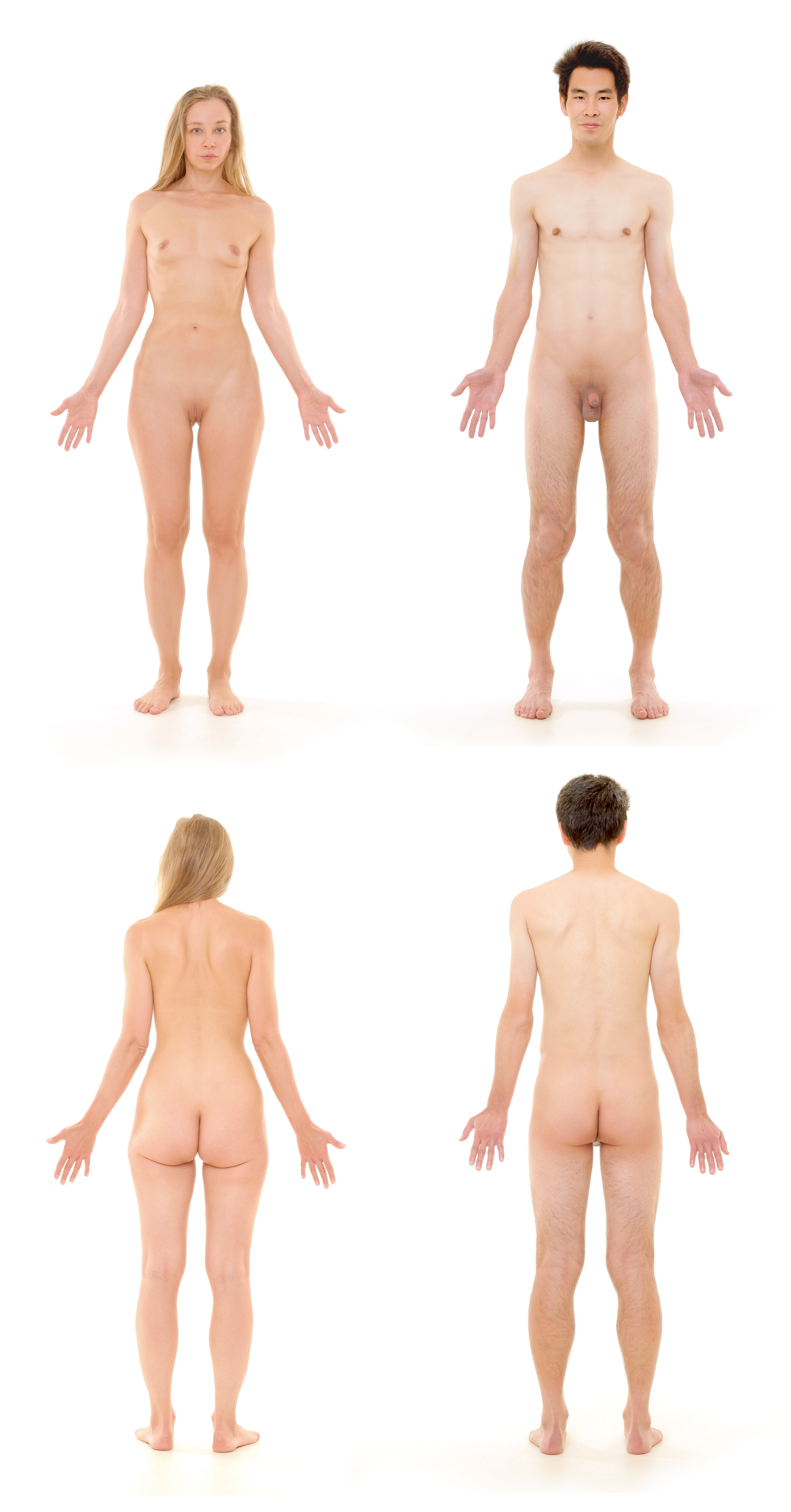
Example of male and female anatomy from front and back

Sexual dimorphism in human physiology refers to the distinct physiological characteristics associated with either male or female humans. These differences are caused by the effects of the different sex chromosome complement in males and females, and differential exposure to gonadal sex hormones during development. Sexual dimorphism is a term for the phenotypic difference between males and females of the same species.

The process of meiosis and fertilization (with rare exceptions) results in a zygote with either two X chromosomes (an XX female) or one X and one Y chromosome (an XY male), which then develops the typical female or male phenotype. Physiological sex differences include discrete features such as the respective male and female reproductive systems, as well as average differences between males and females including size and strength, bodily proportions, hair distribution, breast differentiation, voice pitch, and brain size and structure.

Other than external genitals, there are few physical differences between male and female children before puberty. Small differences in height and start of physical maturity are seen. The gradual growth in sex difference throughout a person's life is a product of various hormones. Testosterone is the major active hormone in male development, while estrogen is the dominant female hormone. These hormones are not, however, limited to each sex. Both males and females have both testosterone and estrogen.

== Sex determination and differentiation ==
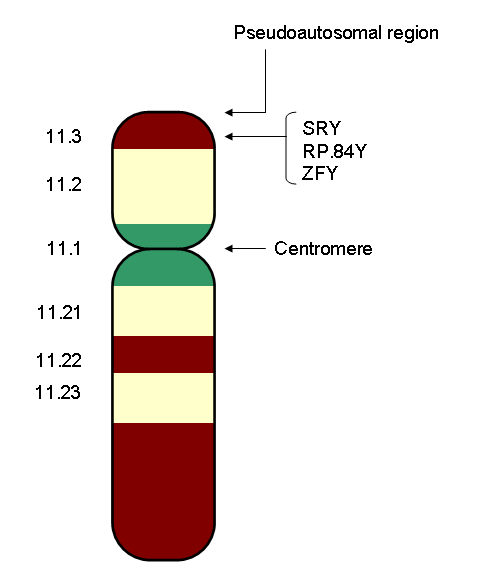
The human Y chromosome showing the SRY gene. SRY is a gene which regulates sexual differentiation.

The human genome consists of two copies of each of 23 chromosomes (a total of 46). One set of 23 comes from the mother and one set comes from the father. Of these 23 pairs of chromosomes, 22 are autosomes, and one is a sex chromosome. There are two kinds of sex chromosomes–X and Y. In humans and in almost all other mammals, females carry two X chromosomes, designated XX, and males carry one X and one Y, designated XY.

A human egg contains only one set of chromosomes (23) and is a haploid. Sperm also have only one set of 23 chromosomes and are therefore haploid. When an egg and sperm fuse at fertilization, the two sets of chromosomes come together to form a unique diploid individual with 46 chromosomes.

The sex chromosome in a human egg is always an X chromosome since a female only has X sex chromosomes. In sperm, about half the sperm have an X chromosome and half have a Y chromosome. If an egg fuses with sperm with a Y chromosome, the resulting individual is male. If an egg fuses with sperm with an X chromosome, the resulting individual is female. There are rare exceptions to this rule in which, for example, XX individuals develop as males or XY individuals develop as females. There are other variations of sex chromosomes that lead to a variety of different physical expressions.

The X-chromosome carries a larger number of genes in comparison to the Y-chromosome. In humans, X-chromosome inactivation enables males and females to have an equal expression of the genes on the X-chromosome since females have two X-chromosomes while males have a single X and a Y chromosome. X-chromosome inactivation is random in the somatic cells of the body as either the maternal or paternal X-chromosome can become inactivated in each cell. Thus, females are genetic mosaics.

== Sexual organs and reproductive systems ==
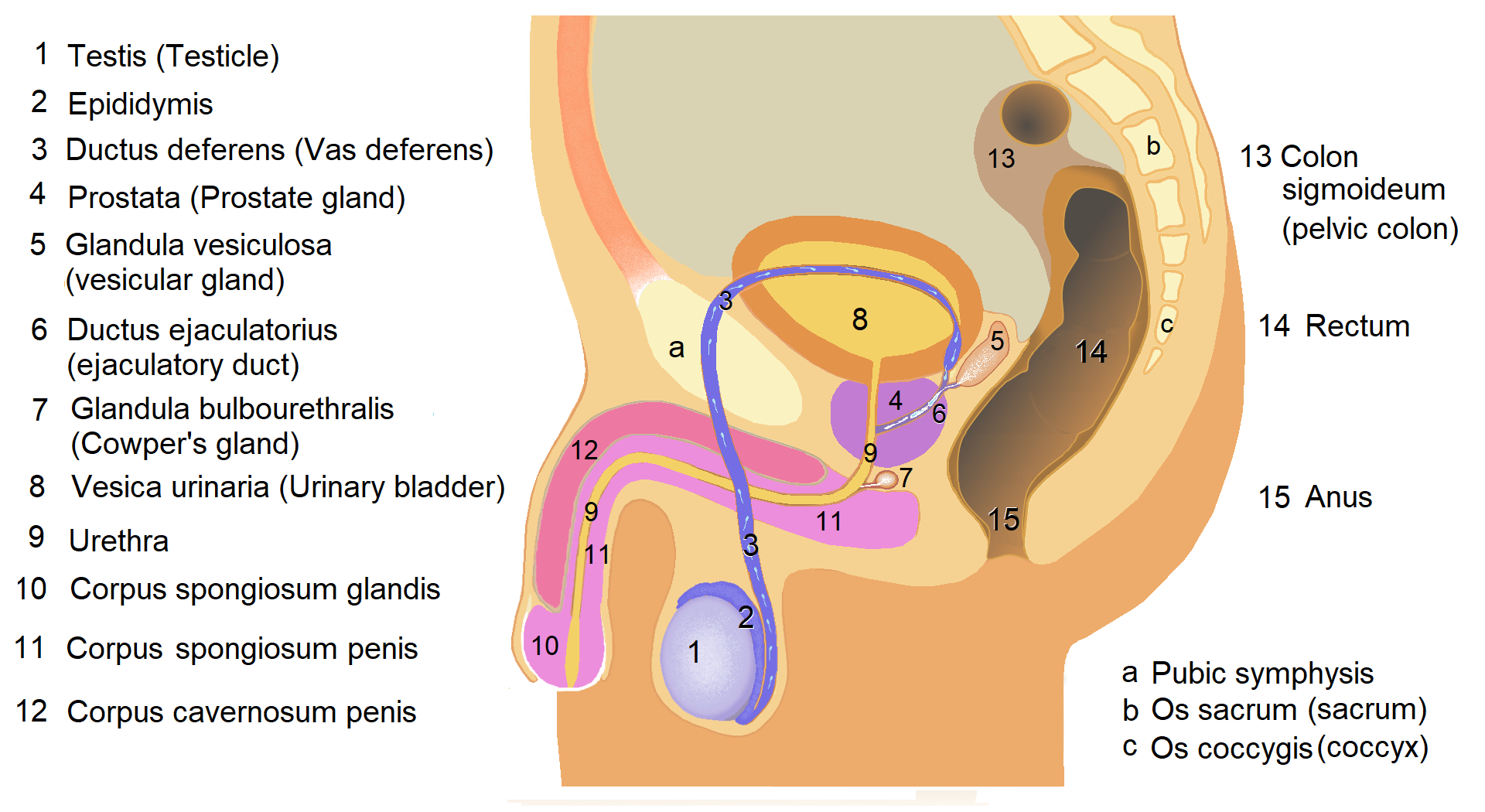
The human male reproductive system.

The human female reproductive system.

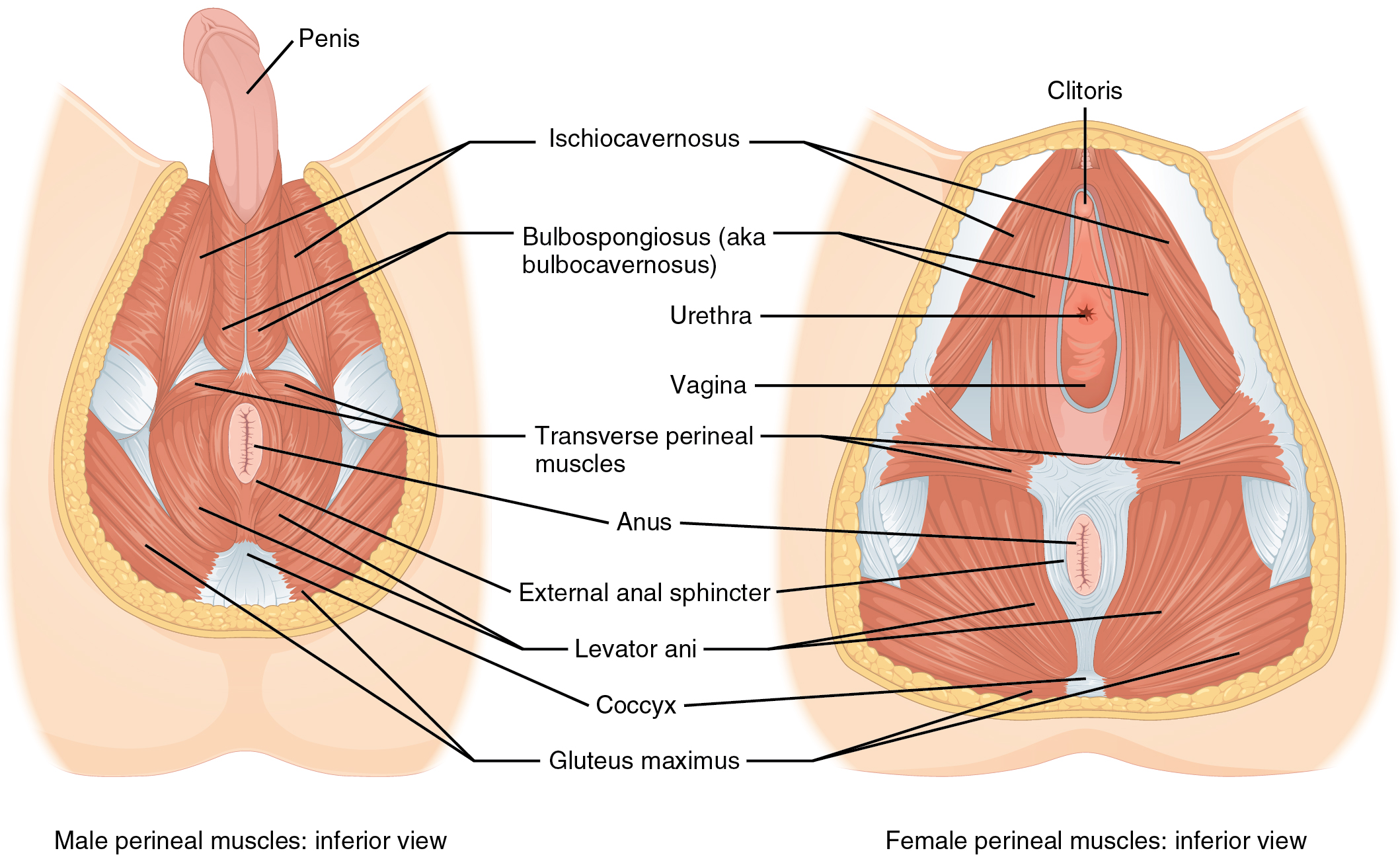
The male and female perineum

As with all other Therian mammals, human males and females have different sex organs, which constitute the primary sex characteristics. Embryos begin undifferentiated, with a system of paramesonephric and mesonephric ducts and a urogenital sinus. As embryos develop, the secretion of sex hormones causes these organs to develop differently, eventually turning into fully-developed sex organs. Females have an external vulva, a uterus which is connected to a vagina, and two ovaries that store the eggs. Males have testicles that produce sperm inside the scrotum behind the penis.

Both males and females have the ability to ejaculate. Female ejaculate does not contain sperm, but is otherwise similar to semen. They are respectively produced in the prostate in males and Skene's gland in females, which despite being different organs arise from the same set of embryonic tissue. Female ejaculation is distinct from urination during sex, or 'squirting', which is relatively common in females and with which it is often confused.

As sperm must reach the uterus in order to fuse with an egg, male orgasm and ejaculation are necessary for reproduction under normal circumstances. The female orgasm is by contrast not necessary for reproduction; it is believed to have evolved among basal mammals as part of induced ovulation. As humans are spontaneous ovulators, the female orgasm being maintained suggests it may play a role in sexual selection, though this has not been confirmed.

=== Reproductive cost ===
The differing male and female reproductive systems lead to a large difference between the sexes in the biological cost of children. Males have a relatively low reproductive cost; they on average produce about two hundred million sperm a day, and a single ejaculation is enough to achieve fertilization with no further involvement on the male's part. Females, by contrast, typically produce one ovum a month that can be fertilized into an embryo, which must then be incubated for nine months before birth. This is very energy-intensive process, consuming about 80,000 kilocalories of energy on average. These increased energy requirements make frequent parenting more risky for females than males, exacerbated by the risk of death or serious injury in childbirth.

These differences theoretically mean that during a lifetime males are able to father a significantly greater number of children than females can give birth to. However in practice this rarely happens, as the extreme K-selection of human beings forces a high decree of paternal social care for a male's offspring that makes a large number of children undesirable for fathers. Extremes such as Moroccan Emperor Ismail Ibn Sharif, who reportedly fathered more than 800 children from a harem of 500 women, are not considered reflective of the wider male population.

=== Fertility ===
Fertility for both males and females decreases with age, with female fertility starting to decline in the early 30s and male fertility in the mid-30s. The pattern of this decrease differs substantially in that females go through menopause, after which fertility ends, whereas male fertility tapers without necessarily becoming zero. Declining fertility in males is marked by reduced sperm count, semen volume, and a degradation of sperm DNA that causes more of the remaining sperm to be non-viable.

Both advanced maternal age and paternal age represent an increased risk of non-viable embryos, miscarriages and stillbirths. Advanced paternal age specifically is correlated with a higher risk of conditions caused by a single DNA error, such as craniosynostosis and achondroplasia, alongside increased prevalence of psychiatric disorders such as schizophrenia, bipolar disorder and autism. Advanced maternal age is in turn potentially associated with an increased risk of cardiovascular disease among offspring.

== Size and body shape ==
Human males are on average about 13 cm taller than females. The exact causes of this difference are not currently known; analysis of the heights of intersex people with XXY chromosomes and women with XY chromosomes and complete androgen insensitivity syndrome suggests that about a quarter of the difference can be traced to the Y chromosome itself and another quarter to androgens produced in the testicles, but studies have differed as to the precise amount these factors impact height.

Human body shapes are also sexually dimorphic, with males on average weighing slightly more than females even after adjusting for height difference. Females have larger hips in proportion to their waist and a larger percentage of body fat than males do, caused by the release of estrogen during puberty that guides patterns of fat distribution. Once females reach menopause, a reduction in levels of estrogen causes their fat to shift to a more male-like distribution.

=== Breasts ===
One of the most notable examples of sexual dimorphism between human males and females is that the latter, unique among primates, have permanent breasts. A number of theories have been suggested for why permanent breasts evolved in humans, such as that they developed as a courtship display to replace anal sexual swelling during the human transition to bipedalism, that they are a side-effect of increased fat levels caused by increased meat consumption in Homo ergaster and its descendants, or some combination of these factors.

In spite of the fact that males lack permanent breasts, the internal biology of the male and female breast is similar; both sexes have nipples and milk ducts, and galactorrhea, or the production of breast milk absent childbirth, can affect both sexes. During early childhood male and female breasts are largely the same, but they diverge during puberty as increased levels of estrogen, progesterone and prolactin cause female breasts to develop into their adult form. As it is these hormones that cause permanent breasts to develop in humans, males may also develop them as a result of conditions such as gynecomastia, and transgender females may develop them through hormone replacement therapy.

== Skin and hair ==
=== Skin ===
Males' skin is thicker and oilier than females' skin. Females have more subcutaneous fat than males. This helps keep them warmer and enables them to survive lower temperatures than males during the cold. As a result of greater vasoconstriction, while the surface of female skin is colder than male skin, the deep-skin temperature in females is higher than in males.

Males generally have darker skin than females, due to having higher amounts of melanin. The lighter skin in females helps their bodies synthesize more Vitamin D from sunlight and absorb more calcium, which is needed during pregnancy and lactation. In lighter-complected humans male skin is visibly redder; this is due to greater blood volume rather than melanin.

Women typically show signs of skin aging earlier than men, with fine lines often appearing in their 30s. They also tend to experience a faster loss of collagen during menopause. In contrast, men’s skin typically ages more gradually until later in life.

=== Hair ===
On average, males have more body hair than females. Males have relatively more of a type of hair called terminal hair, especially on the face, chest, abdomen and back. Females have more vellus hair, which is thinner, shorter, and lighter, and therefore less visible.

Although males grow hair faster than females, baldness is more prevalent in males than in females. The main cause for this is male pattern baldness. Male pattern baldness is a condition where hair loss occurs in a typical pattern of a receding hairline and hair thinning on the crown. It is caused by hormones and genetic predisposition.

In one study, almost twice as many females as males had red or auburn hair. A higher proportion of females were also found to have blond hair, whereas males were more likely to have black or dark brown hair. A different study found that while females tend to have a lower frequency of black hair, males have a higher frequency of platinum blond hair, blue eyes and lighter skin. According to this one theory the cause for this is a higher frequency of genetic recombination in females than in males, possibly due to sex-linked genes, and as a result females tend to show less phenotypical variation in any given population.

== Skeleton and muscular system ==
=== Skeleton ===
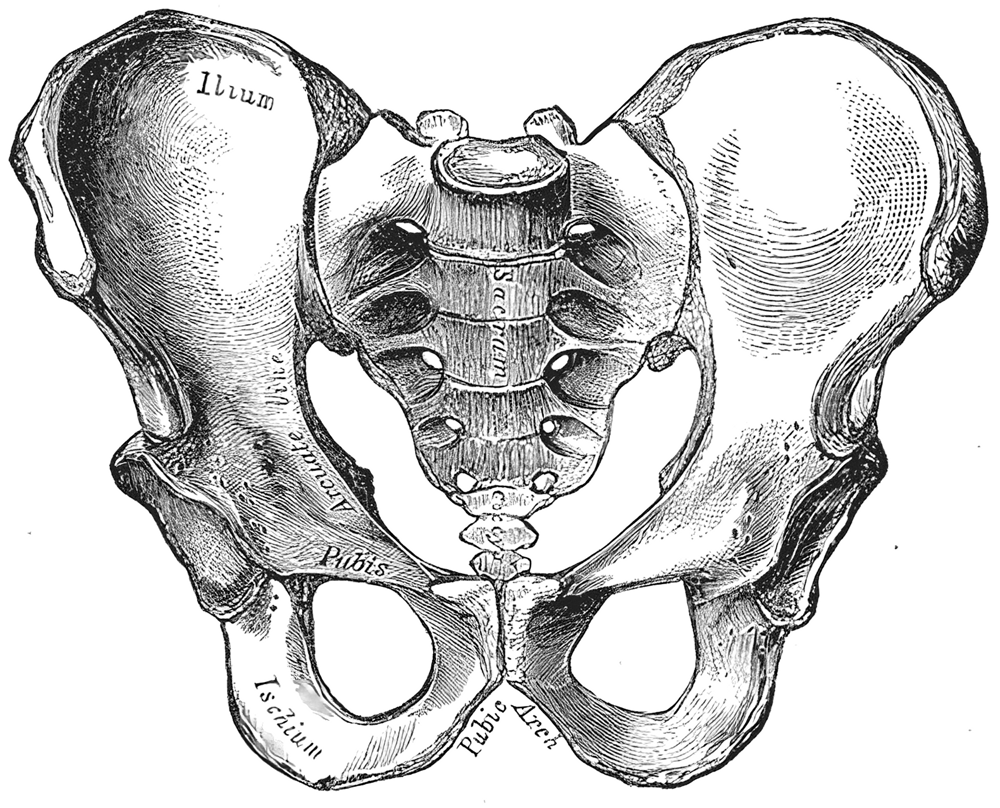
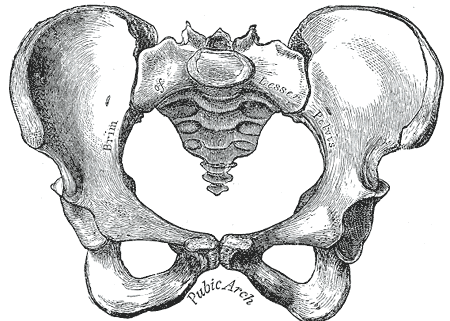
Comparison between a male (left) and a female pelvis (right).

The female skeleton is less dense, smaller, and thinner than the male; its rib cage is more rounded and smaller, its lumbar curve greater, and a generally longer and smaller female waist results from the chest being more narrow at the base, and the pelvis generally not as high. Males and females do not differ in their number of ribs; both normally have twelve pairs.

Studies show that men have a higher Bone Mineral Density (BMD) than women. It shows BMD values of approximately 3.88 g/cm² for men and 2.90 g/cm² for women, showing that male bones are 34% denser than female bones. After controlling for the same height and weight, males still exhibited 8% higher BMD at the hip and 5% higher BMD at the distal tibia than females. Men also carried substantially more bone mineral content (BMC). In one study of opposite-sex twins, men's total bone mineral content was 26–45% higher than women's at load-bearing sites such as the spine, hip, and forearm. Even after matching for overall bone area, men had higher BMC and BMD at the hip area. This makes females two times more likely to experience fractures in their lifetime compared to males, as well as a significantly higher risk of osteoporosis at old age.

Men's long bones are not just longer, but thicker and more robust. Men exhibit larger periosteal (outer) diameter and cortical (hard outer shell) thickness in many bones. One study found women's long bones had 6–25% smaller cortical area than expected for their size compared to men. These geometric differences translate into mechanical advantage: men have higher cross-sectional moment of inertia and "safety factor" at load bearing sites, meaning their bones resist bending and fracture better.

The pelvis is, in general, different between the human female and male skeleton. Although variations exist and there may be a degree of overlap between typically male or female traits, the pelvis is the most dimorphic bone of the human skeleton and is therefore likely to be accurate when using it to ascertain a person's sex. It differs both in overall shape and structure. The female pelvis, which is adapted for gestation and childbirth, is less high, but proportionately wider and more circular than in the male; its sacrum—the triangular bone at the upper posterior of the pelvic cavity, serving as the base of the spine—is also wider. The female pelvis is tilted anteriorly, often resulting in the more sway-backed appearance.

In females, the acetabula, the concave surfaces to which the balls of the femurs attach via ligaments, are located farther apart, which increases the distance between the most outer points of the femurs (their greater trochanters) and thus the width of the hips. Female femurs are therefore more generally angled (laterally, further away from vertical). This greater angle applies a larger portion of the gravitational or vertical load as valgus torque (rotational force against the knee). This, combined with the female's weaker tendons and ligaments and a narrower intercondylar notch, causes increased susceptibility to injury of the anterior cruciate ligament (ACL) of the knee in female athletes. Women have been reported to be at 2-10 times greater risk of suffering ACL injuries than men in similar sports.

The pelvis of the human male is narrower, taller and denser. This makes the male anatomy more biomechanically suited for efficient locomotion and stride efficiency when walking and running. One hypothesis is that this is largely due to evolutionary male roles in hunting and physical labor. The wider female pelvis is an evolutionary compromise between efficient locomotion and the need for successful childbirth. This is termed the obstetrical dilemma. Disagreement exists as to the strength of the hypothesis.

Men generally have larger, stiffer tendons than females, even after accounting for body size (height and weight). Comparative studies show that men's tendons (e.g. Achilles, patellar) have greater cross-sectional area, greater stiffness, and higher elastic modulus under load. This allows male tendons to transmit higher forces, as stiffer tendons transmit muscle force to bone more directly, requiring less additional muscle work. For example, in a study involving males and females matched for the same body size, male achilles and patellar tendons were still 50–60% stiffer than those in females. In contrast, female tendons are typically smaller in cross-sectional area and more compliant. One study showed that women's Achilles tendons showed more than 4-5 times the strain of men under the same load, showing that women display a lower level of tendon adaptability to loading, as well as lower tendon stiffness and a smaller cross-sectional area than men. In short, women's tendons deform more under load (more elastic), while men's tendons resist stretch more (stiffer), making them mechanically stronger under load and more resistant to injury. These differences are not solely due to body size, but rather due to variations in collagen type and content, with males producing denser, more crosslinked type I collagen, while females produce more extensible type III collagen and matrix proteins. Estrogen modulates these properties by reducing collagen synthesis and increasing ligament laxity, especially during certain phases of the menstrual cycle, which explains why females often have greater flexibility in their joints and ligaments. In contrast, testosterone promotes stiffer, stronger tissue development.

=== Muscle mass and strength ===
Pubertal changes in males lead to a ten times increase in testosterone. On average, adult males have 10-20 times more testosterone than adult females, with male testosterone levels ranging from 300 to 1,000 nanograms per deciliter (ng/dL), while adult females have testosterone levels between 15 and 70 ng/dL. It is because of the effects of testosterone that males tend to develop stronger muscles and denser bones. Studies analysing physical strength in children show conflicting results, with some reporting no significant difference in average strength between girls and boys of the same age, and others show that girls aged 11–12 are about 4-6% physically stronger than boys, due to the earlier onset of puberty., while others reporting that boys are stronger on average. It is after puberty that the gap widens significantly, with a study analysing adolescents aged 14–17 years old showing males of the same age having 50% more upper body strength and 30% more lower body strength than females. Males also go through puberty for longer, thus females typically have lower total muscle mass than males, and also have lower muscle mass relative to total body mass. Males convert more of their caloric intake into muscle and expendable circulating energy reserves, while females tend to convert more into fat deposits. As a consequence, males are generally physically stronger than females. Research suggests that, while males have greater total muscle areas than females, the number of muscle fibers in males and females are alike. Instead of muscle fiber composition as the main reason for male's greater absolute strength, the data indicates that it is total muscle area that is responsible for this difference. Males' individual muscle fibers are larger than women's, which results in their more muscular appearance. Their larger muscle fibers appear responsible for their more considerable absolute force production.

The sex difference in muscle mass still remains even after adjusting for body weight and height. Males are still stronger than females after adjusting for differences in total body mass, due to the males having a higher percentage of their body mass as muscle mass. One study showed that men had 38% of their body weight as skeletal muscle (muscle responsible for movement and force production) while women had 30% when matched for the same body weight. The greater muscle mass is reported to be due to a greater capacity for muscular hypertrophy as a result of higher levels of circulating testosterone in males.

The studies often show different results about the body strength difference between the both sexes. Two studies, conducted in four European Union countries, involving 2,000 participants (1,000 men and 1 000 women) concluded that females are 74 - 92% as strong as males, as many women (211 of 1,000) are still physically stronger than average men. The differences is smaller in lower body strength and higher in upper body strength. One study measuring the upper and lower body strength of males and females by testing 1 rep-maxes(RM) in the bench press and shoulder press(which test for upper body strength), as well as the leg press, back squat and deadlift(which tests lower body strength), females were found to be 40-50% as strong in the upper body strength tests, and 50-55% as strong in the lower body strength tests. Some other researches suggest that females are approximately 50-60% as strong as males in the upper body, and 60-70% as strong in the lower body. In one study examining the strength-to-weight ratio in the lower body between men and women, men exhibited 26% greater relative hamstring strength (3.29 N/kg of hamstring force in males versus 2.62 N/kg in females) and 20% greater relative quadriceps strength (5.48 N/kg of quadriceps force versus 4.55 N/kg) compared to women. In the muscle strength of the core muscles and trunk(abdominal muscles), females have 65 to 75% of male absolute strength, and in the muscle strength of the lower back muscles (erector spinae and trunk extensors), males have 67-82% stronger lower back muscles in absolute terms, compared to females. When comparing lower back strength per kilogram of body weight, women still generated less trunk extension torque(1.09 N·m/kg in women vs. 2.00 N·m/kg for men) - which translates to females having 55% of male lower back strength in relative terms. These differences are particularly due to males having roughly 50-60% greater muscle-cross sectional area per kg of muscle in their core, trunk and lower back muscles, which leads to greater absolute force production.

One study of muscle strength in the elbows and knees—in 45 and older males and females—found the strength of females to range from 42 to 63% of male strength. Males have greater hand grip strength than females. Sex differences in grip strength are substantial and persist across multiple methods of normalization. In a study reporting hand grip measures, males exhibited significantly higher strength than females across all tested variables. The average absolute grip strength was 30.3 kg for men and 10.6 kg for women, indicating that males had approximately 186% greater absolute grip strength. When adjusted for body mass, men still showed a 119% advantage (0.35 vs 0.16). Even when scaled to height, males maintained a 143% higher grip strength (103.6 vs 42.6). These results are statistically significant (p < 0.0001) and demonstrate that gender differences in grip strength are not solely due to differences in body size or mass.

== Respiratory and cardiovascular systems ==
Males typically have larger lungs than females. On average, males have a total lung capacity (TLC) of 6 litres, while females have a total lung capacity of 4.2 litres. Even when males and females are matched for height and body size in a controlled comparison, males still tend to have 12% greater lung volume relative to body mass. This is often due to males having a greater thoracic cavity volume than females, not due to differences in size, but rather due to differences in skeletal anatomy between males and females. On average, males have larger airways, with the trachea and bronchi being approximately 35% larger in males than in females.

On average, male hearts are approximately 31% larger than female hearts in absolute terms (i.e., without adjusting for body size). In controlled comparisons—where height and body size are matched—male hearts are still, on average 25% larger than female hearts, particularly due to greater left ventricular (LV) mass, larger atrial and ventricular cavities, and thicker ventricular walls and chambers in males. For example, one study reported a mean heart mass of 374 ± 64 grams in males and 285 ± 55 grams in females. Males also have, on average 10% higher red blood cell count, and higher haemoglobin hence greater oxygen-carrying capacity. They have higher circulating clotting factors (vitamin K, prothrombin and platelets). These differences lead to faster clotting of blood and higher peripheral pain tolerance.

Sex differences in the trachea and main bronchi are not apparent until at least age 14. On average, females have smaller lungs than males at birth.

== Brain and nervous system ==
=== Brain ===
The brains of humans were long believed to be different for males and females. However, this has been called into question by recent developments in neuroscience. For example, studies published in 2018, 2019, and 2021, among others, have challenged the idea of sexual dimorphism regarding the brain, with one study concluding firmly that "brains are not meaningfully aligned along a male-female continuum." When the size of one's head is accounted for, brain differences between sexes are no longer clear, and they are not generalizable across geographic regions (i.e., what is considered a brain sex distinction in Europeans may not correlate to sex distinctions in Asian populations).

==== Brain size ====
The human brain. Differences in male and female brain size are relative to body size.

Early research into the differences between male and female brains showed that male brains are, on average, larger than female brains. This research was frequently cited to support the assertion that women are less intelligent than men. One of the most influential early researchers on this topic was Paul Broca. In 1861, he examined 432 human brains from cadavers and found that the brains of males had an average weight of 1325 grams, while the brains of females had an average weight of 1144 grams. This study, however, did not control for differences in body size or age. Later studies have shown that while male's brains are an average of 10-15% larger and heavier than female's brains, there is relatively no difference when controlling for body weight. This means the brain-to-body mass ratio is, on average, approximately the same for both sexes. Comparing a male and a female of the same body size, an average difference of 100 grams in brain-mass is present, the male having the bigger and heavier brain. This difference of 100 grams applies over the whole range of human sizes.

==== Brain structure ====
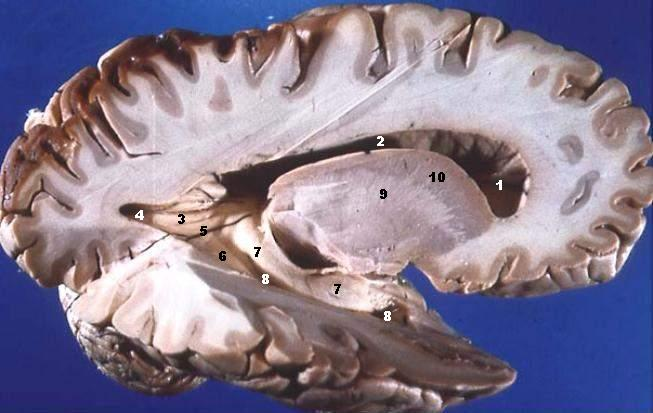
The male and female brains show some differences in internal structure. One difference is the proportions of white matter relative to grey matter.

Structural brain differences usually correspond to sexually dimorphic attributes that bring about functional brain differences.

On average, female brains have a larger ratio of grey matter to the white matter than males (particularly in the dorsolateral prefrontal cortex and superior temporal gyrus), even when sex-differences in the total intracranial volume are taken into consideration. Most notably, males have a larger amount of white matter in the frontal and temporal perisylvian region, and in the temporal stem and optic radiation, of the left hemisphere, whereas females have a larger amount of gray matter in the superior temporal gyrus, planum temporale, Heschl gyrus, cingulate gyrus, inferior frontal, and central sulci margins, of the left hemisphere.

The degree of hemispheric asymmetry in males corresponds to the relative size of corpus callosum; however, this is not true in females. An increase in hemispheric asymmetry in male brains causes a male sex-dependent decrease in inter-hemispheric connectivity. Many studies suggest that, on average, female brains have more commissural tracts involved in inter-hemispheric connectivity than males. Specifically, studies suggests that:

- The anterior commissure is larger in females than males.
- The massa intermedia is more abundant in females than males.
- Females have a larger ratio of the cross-sectional area of the corpus callosum to cerebral volume and to forebrain size than males.

Several studies have reached contrary conclusions.

There are also differences in the structure of specific areas of the brain. On average, the SDN has been repeatedly found to be considerably larger in males than in females. The volume of the SDN was 2.2 times as large in males as in females. On average, the BSTc is twice as large in males as in females. On average, the INAH-3 is significantly larger in males than in females regardless of age. Two studies found that men have larger parietal lobes, an area responsible for sensory input including spatial sense and navigation; though, another study failed to find any statistically significant difference. At the same time, females have larger Wernicke's and Broca's areas, areas responsible for language processing. Studies using MRI scanning have shown that the auditory and language-related regions in the left hemisphere are proportionally expanded in females versus in males. Conversely, the primary visual, and visuo-spatial association areas of the parietal lobes are proportionally larger in males. The corpus callous is located at the sagittal divide and is the primary commissure in the human brain. It connects the left and right hemispheres of the cerebral cortex, which allows them to communicate with each other. With respect to language, males predominantly use their left hemisphere but females use both their right and left hemispheres. The right hemisphere controls emotion, so using the right hemisphere adds more prosody to speech. In males, the corpus callosum is larger than in females. However, the splenium and the isthmus subregions of the corpus callosum are larger in females. The genu subregion is larger in males. These subregions may serve as the basis for sex differences in language. However, a 1997 meta-study concluded that there is no relative size difference, and that the larger corpus callosum in males is due to generally larger brains in males on average; a small man and a large man would therefore have the same distinctions as the average man and the average woman.

In total and on average, females have a higher percentage of grey matter in comparison to males, and males a higher percentage of white matter. However, some researchers maintain that as males have larger brains on average than females, when adjusted for total brain volume, the grey matter differences between sexes is small or nonexistent. Thus, the percentage of grey matter appears to be more related to brain size than it is to sex.

In 2005, Haier et al. reported that, compared with males, females show fewer grey matter areas associated with intelligence, but more white matter areas associated with intelligence. He concluded that "men and women apparently achieve similar IQ results with different brain regions, suggesting that there is no singular underlying neuroanatomical structure to general intelligence and that different types of brain designs may manifest equivalent intellectual performance." Using brain mapping, it was shown that males have more than six times the amount of gray matter related to general intelligence than females, and females have nearly ten times the amount of white matter related to intelligence than males. They also report that the brain areas correlated with IQ differ between the sexes. In short, males and females apparently achieve similar IQ results with different brain regions. However, a 2019 study challenged the base assertions of articles such as Haier et al., finding there is no significant difference in grey matter volume between males and females when controlling for total intracranial volume.

The amygdala is a structure that generates emotional responses such as fear, anxiety, and anger. The male amygdala was originally believed to be proportionally larger than that in females, causing sex to be a determining factor in reactions to stress. However, newer studies have concluded this is not the case. When controlling for intracranial volume or total brain volume, there is no significant difference in amygdala size between the sexes. The hippocampus, crucial for memory storage and spatial mapping of the physical environment, was likewise thought to be larger in females than in males. However, it is now believed to not be sexually dimorphic.

A brain study done by the NIH showed that the females had greater volume in the prefrontal cortex, orbitofrontal cortex, superior temporal cortex, lateral parietal cortex, and insula, whereas males had greater volume in the ventral temporal and occipital regions.

=== Sensory systems ===
- Some studies have shown that females have a more sensitive sense of smell than males, both in the differentiation of odors and in the detection of slight or faint odors.
- Females have more pain receptors in the skin. That may contribute to the lower pain tolerance of females. While most females expect to be less tolerant to pain, males expect to be more tolerant and therefore report agitation later. Due to variation across societies of gender roles, results of pain studies also vary depending on gender expectations.
- Females also report a higher prevalence of many pain-related diseases and syndromes, particularly auto-immune diseases. In a 2005 study, Holdcroft and Beckley show a higher female prevalence of many conditions of the head and neck (e.g., migraine), limbs (e.g., carpal tunnel syndrome), internal organs (IBS), and more general conditions (multiple sclerosis). Fewer conditions show a male prevalence: e.g., cluster headache, gout.
- In addition to defined diseases and syndromes, many common "everyday" pains appear to overburden females rather than males. Therefore, studies consistently find that females report more severe pain, more frequent pain, longer-lasting pain, and wider-ranging pain than males. For example, common painful conditions such as dysmenorrhea may predispose females to more widespread musculoskeletal pains.
- Females show higher performance levels on tests of verbal fluency. This may be because the female auditory cortex is denser than that of the male. This difference and other sensory differences like it could be because of the sex hormones that impact the fetal brain during development.

== Health ==
=== Life span ===
Females consistently live longer than males across human populations, by several years on average. A certain degree of this difference can be attributed to gender roles rather than sexual dimorphism, with unhealthy behaviours such as smoking being more accepted and therefore more prevalent among males, but there are also numerous biological traits cited as reasons for the discrepancy. These include females producing more killer T cells and cytokines in later life than males, and that estrogen causes the production of higher-density lipoproteins.

=== Immune system ===
Strength and type of immune response differ in males and females. Generally speaking, females have a stronger immune response than males. This results in males having a higher morbidity and mortality from infectious diseases than females do, and lower rates of auto-immune diseases. Females typically have more white blood cells (stored and circulating), more granulocytes, and B and T lymphocytes. Additionally, they produce more antibodies at a faster rate than males. Hence they develop fewer infectious diseases and succumb for shorter periods.

=== Sex chromosome disorders ===
Certain diseases and conditions are clearly sex-related in that they are caused by the same chromosomes that regulate sex differentiation. Some conditions are X-linked recessive, in that the gene is carried on the X chromosome. Genetic females (XX) will show symptoms of the disease only if both their X chromosomes are defective with a similar deficiency, whereas genetic males (XY) will show symptoms of the disease if their only X chromosome is defective. (A female may carry such a disease on one X chromosome but not show symptoms if the other X chromosome works sufficiently.) For this reason, such conditions are far more common in males than in females.

== See also ==
- Sex ratio
- Sex differences in psychology
- Gender-based medicine
- Genetics of sex
- Gender differences in coping
- Sexual dimorphism
- Sex differentiation
- Sex and intelligence
- Virilization
- List of homologues of the human reproductive system
- Man flu

== Bibliography ==
- Basanta, Silvia; de la Rosa, Laura Nuño (2022). "The female orgasm and the homology concept in evolutionary biology". Journal of Morphology. 284 (1) e21544: 1–13. doi:10.1002/jmor.21544. PMC 10108237. PMID 36533733.
- Birke, Lydia (2001). Lederman, Muriel; Bartsch, Ingrid (eds.). The Gender and Science Reader. New York: Routledge. ISBN 0415213576.
- Bribiescas, Richard G. (4 January 2002). "Reproductive ecology and life history of the human male". American Journal of Biological Anthropology. 166 (S33): 148–176. doi:10.1002/ajpa.10025. PMID 11786994.
- Butkovskaya, Marina L.; Rostovtseva, Victoria V.; Dronova, Daria A.; Mezentsava, Anna A.; et al. (28 May 2026). "Sexual Dimorphism in Facial and Body Shape and Their Relationship in Modern Humans of African, Asian, and European Descent". American Journal of Human Biology. 38 (6) e70282: 1–19. doi:10.1002/ajhb.70282. PMID 42206769.
- Carrel, Laura; Willard, Huntington Faxel (March 2005). "X-inactivation profile reveals extensive variability in X-linked gene expression in females". Nature. 434 (7031): 400–404. Bibcode:2005Natur.434..400C. doi:10.1038/nature03479. PMID 15772666. S2CID 4358447.
- Caruso, Calegoro; Accardi, Giulia; Virruso, Claudia; Candore, Guiseppina (16 May 2013). "Sex, gender and immunosenescence: a key to understand the different lifespan between men and women?". Immunity & Ageing. 10 (20) 20: 1–3. doi:10.1186/1742-4933-10-20. PMC 3737094. PMID 23680476.
- Cooke, Christy-Lynn M.; Davidge, Sandra T. (2019). "Advanced maternal age and the impact on maternal and offspring cardiovascular health". American Journal of Physiology. Heart and Circulatory Physiology. 317 (2): 387–394. doi:10.1152/ajpheart.00045.2019. PMID 31199185.
- Daly, Robin M.; Rosengren, Bjorn E.; Alwis, Gayani; Ahlborg, Henrik G.; et al. (July 6, 2013). "Gender specific age-related changes in bone density, muscle strength and functional performance in the elderly: a-10 year prospective population-based study". BMC Geriatrics. 13 71: 1–9. doi:10.1186/1471-2318-13-71. PMC 3716823. PMID 23829776.
- Einon, Dorothy (November 1998). "How Many Children Can One Man Have?". Evolution and Human Behavior. 19 (6): 413–426. Bibcode:1998EHumB..19..413E. doi:10.1016/S1090-5138(98)00026-9.
- Fukami, Maki; Ogata, Tsutomu; Hattori, Atsushi (2025). "Why are men taller than women?: Genetic and hormonal factors involved in sex differences in human height". Journal of Human Genetics. 70 (11): 609–610. doi:10.1038/s10038-025-01384-4. PMC 12552116. PMID 40813449.
- García, Désirée; Brazal, Sarai; Rodríguez, Amelia; Prat, Andrés; et al. (November 2018). "Knowledge of age-related fertility decline in women: A systematic review". European Journal of Obstetrics & Gynecology and Reproductive Biology. 230: 109–118. doi:10.1016/j.ejogrb.2018.09.030. PMID 30248536.
- Halvei, Iman; Litzky, Julie; Esfandiari, Navid (13 November 2020). "Advanced paternal age: effects on sperm parameters, assisted reproduction outcomes and offspring health". Reproductive Biology and Endocrinology. 18 (110) 110: 1–12. doi:10.1186/s12958-020-00668-y. PMC 7664076. PMID 33183337.
- Hendarto, Hari (2017). "Prolactinoma with galactorrhea and dysfunction erectile in man, a case report". Proceedings of the 1st International Integrative Conference on Health, Life and Social Sciences (ICHLaS 2017). Vol. 10. pp. 36–37. doi:10.2991/ichlas-17.2017.10. ISBN 978-94-6252-422-4.
- Jones, Richard E.; Lopez, Kristin H. (28 September 2013). Human Reproductive Biology (4th ed.). Academic Press. ISBN 9780123821850.
- Korda, Joanna B.; Goldstein, Sue W.; Sommer, Frank (May 2010). "The history of female ejaculation". The Journal of Sexual Medicine. 7 (5): 1965–75. doi:10.1111/j.1743-6109.2010.01720.x. PMID 20233286.
- Langsetmo, Lisa; Leslie, William D.; Zhou, Wei; Goltzman, David; et al. (October 2010). "Using the same bone density reference database for men and women provides a simpler estimation of fracture risk". Journal of Bone and Mineral Research. 25 (10): 2108–2114. doi:10.1002/jbmr.112. PMC 5101072. PMID 20499356.
- Laopaiboon, Malinee; Lumbiganon, Pisake; Intarut, Nirun; Mori, Rintaro; et al. (18 March 2014). "Advanced maternal age and pregnancy outcomes: a multicountry assessment". BJOG: An International Journal of Obstetrics & Gynaecology. 121 (s1): 49–56. doi:10.1111/1471-0528.12659. PMID 24641535.
- Matorras, Roberto; Matorras, Francisco; Expósito, Antonia; Martinez, Lorea; et al. (2011). "Decline in Human Fertility Rates with Male Age: A Consequence of a Decrease in Male Fecundity with Aging?". Gynecologic and Obstetric Investigation. 71 (4): 229–235. doi:10.1159/000319236. PMID 21160151.
- Mills, Melinda C.; Barban, Nicola; Tropf, Felix C. (2020). An Introduction to Statistical Genetic Data Analysis. MIT Press. ISBN 978-0-262-35744-9.
- Moya, Cristina; Snopkowski, Kristin; Sear, Rebecca (2016). "What do men want? Re-examining whether men benefit from higher fertility than is optimal for women". Philosophical Transactions of the Royal Society B: Biological Sciences. 71 (1692): 1–13. doi:10.1098/rstb.2015.0149. PMC 4822429. PMID 27022076.
- Naganathan, Vasi; Sambrook, Philip (July 2003). "Gender differences in volumetric bone density: a study of opposite-sex twins". Osteoporosis International. 14 (7): 564–569. doi:10.1007/s00198-003-1422-3. PMID 12830370.
- Neville, Margaret C. (14 June 2023). "Lactation in the human". Animal Frontiers. 13 (3): 71–77. doi:10.1093/af/vfad021. PMC 10266744. PMID 37324212.
- Nieves, Jeri W.; Formica, Carmelo; Ruffing, Jamie; Zion, Marsha; et al. (March 2005). "Males have larger skeletal size and bone mass than females, despite comparable body size". Journal of Bone and Mineral Research. 20 (3): 529–535. doi:10.1359/JBMR.041005. PMID 15746999.
- Pastor, Zlatko; Chmel, Roman (May 2018). "Differential diagnostics of female "sexual" fluids: a narrative review". International Urogynecology Journal. 29 (5): 621–629. doi:10.1007/s00192-017-3527-9. PMID 29285596. S2CID 5045626.
- Patton, Kevin T.; Thibodeau, Gary A. (2018). Anthony's Textbook of Anatomy & Physiology - E-Book. Elsevier Health Sciences. ISBN 978-0-323-70930-9.
- Pavlicev, Mihaela; Wagner, Gunter (2016). "The Evolutionary Origin of Female Orgasm". Journal of Experimental Zoology Part B: Molecular and Developmental Evolution. 326 (3): 326–337. Bibcode:2016JEZB..326..326P. doi:10.1002/jez.b.22690. PMID 27478160.
- Pawłowski, Bogusław; Żelaźniewicz, Agnieszka (December 2021). "The evolution of perennially enlarged breasts in women: a critical review and a novel hypothesis". Biological Reviews. 96 (6): 2794–2809. doi:10.1111/brv.12778. PMID 34254729.
- Penn, Dustin J.; Smith, Ken R. (9 January 2007). "Differential fitness costs of reproduction between the sexes". Proceedings of the National Academy of Sciences of the United States of America. 104 (2): 553–558. Bibcode:2007PNAS..104..553P. doi:10.1073/pnas.0609301103. PMC 1766423. PMID 17192400.
- Rieger, Rigomar; Michaelis, Arnd; Green, Melvin M. (2012). Glossary of Genetics: Classical and Molecular. Springer Science & Business Media. ISBN 978-3-642-75333-6.
- Runolfsdottir, Hrafnhildur L.; Sigurdsson, Gunnar; Franzson, Leifur; Indridason, Olafur S. (2015). "Gender comparison of factors associated with age-related differences in bone mineral density". Archives of Osteoporosis. 10 23: 214. doi:10.1007/s11657-015-0214-7. PMID 26239743.
- Schuenke, Michael; Schulte, Erik; Schumacher, Udo (2006). Thieme Atlas of Anatomy: General Anatomy and Musculoskeletal System. Thieme. ISBN 978-1-58890-419-5.
- Snustad, D. Peter; Simmons, Michael J. (2015). Principles of Genetics. John Wiley & Sons. ISBN 978-1-119-14228-7.
- Solomon, Eldra; Martin, Charles; Martin, Diana W.; Berg, Linda R. (2014). Biology. Cengage Learning. ISBN 978-1-305-17989-9.
- Thompson, Mary Emery (2013). "Comparative Reproductive Energetics of Human and Nonhuman Primates". Annual Review of Anthropology. 42: 287–304. doi:10.1146/annurev-anthro-092412-155530.
- Wells, Jonathan C.K. (September 2007). "Sexual dimorphism of body composition". Best Practice & Research Clinical Endocrinology & Metabolism. 21 (3): 415–430. doi:10.1016/j.beem.2007.04.007. PMID 17875489.
- Yoshida, Keiza; Higuchi, Hisashi; Takahashi, Hitoshi; Shimuzu, Tetsuo (2004). "Ejaculation After Defecation Without Orgasm Induced by Milnacipran". The Journal of Neuropsychiatry and Clinical Neurosciences. 16 (4): 544. doi:10.1176/jnp.16.4.544. PMID 15616184.
