= Lanugo =

Type of soft baby hair

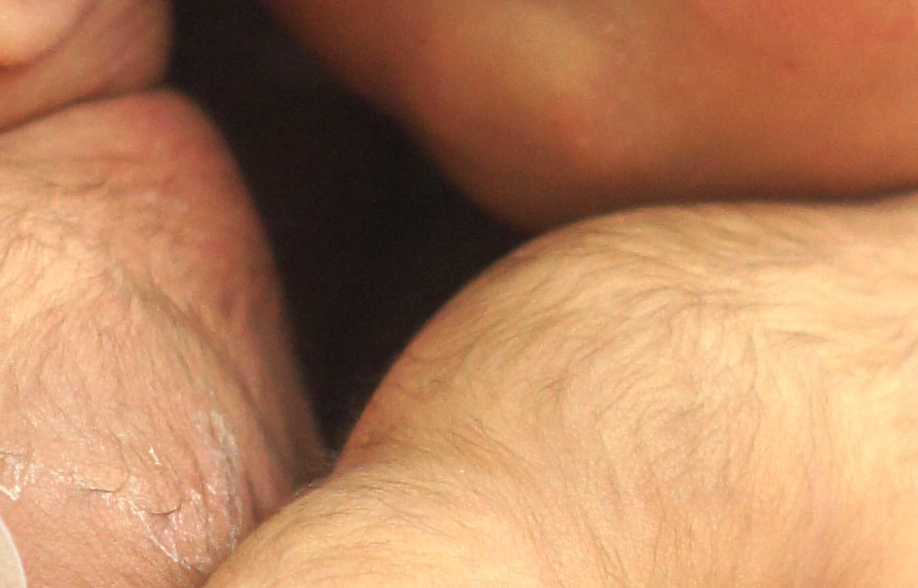
- Lanugo

Identifiers
- TA98: A16.0.00.015
- TA2: 7054
- FMA: 70667

Lanugo (/ləˈnjuːɡoʊ/) is very thin, soft, usually unpigmented hair that is sometimes found on the body of a fetus or newborn. It is the first hair to be produced by the fetal hair follicles, and it usually appears around sixteen weeks of gestation and is abundant by week twenty. It is normally shed before birth, around seven or eight months of gestation, but is sometimes present at birth. It disappears on its own within a few weeks.

It is replaced by hair covering the same surfaces, which is called vellus hair. This hair is thinner and more difficult to see. The more visible hair that persists into adulthood is called terminal hair. It forms in specific areas and is hormone-dependent. The term is from the Latin lana, meaning "wool."

== Humans ==
=== Fetal development ===
During human development, the lanugo grows on fetuses as a normal part of gestation, but it is usually shed and replaced by vellus hair at about thirty-three to thirty-six weeks of gestational age. As the lanugo is shed from the skin, it is normal for the hair to be consumed by the developing fetus, since it drinks from the amniotic fluid and urinates into its environment. As a result, lanugo contributes to the newborn baby's meconium. The presence of lanugo on newborns is not necessarily a sign of premature birth, as it is also seen on infants born at thirty-nine weeks of gestation (full term).

Lanugo functions as an anchor to hold the vernix caseosa on the skin. Together they protect the delicate fetal skin from being damaged by the amniotic fluid. The vernix caseosa also helps to prepare the fetus for life outside the womb. It provides lubrication for birth and contributes to thermoregulation, prevention of water loss, and innate immunity. Without the lanugo to anchor the vernix caseosa, these functions would be compromised.

=== Malnutrition ===
In the absence of fat, lanugo grows to serve as a replacement insulator, and thus can be observed in malnourished patients, including those with eating disorders. When found along with other physical symptoms, lanugo can help a physician make a diagnosis of anorexia nervosa or bulimia nervosa.

=== Teratoma ===
It is often found in teratomas (congenital tumours).

== Other mammals ==
Lanugo is also common on other mammals. For example, seals and elephants are often born with a covering of lanugo. Fetuses of some species of whales and dolphins also have lanugo.
