= Familial dwarfism and painful muscle spasms =

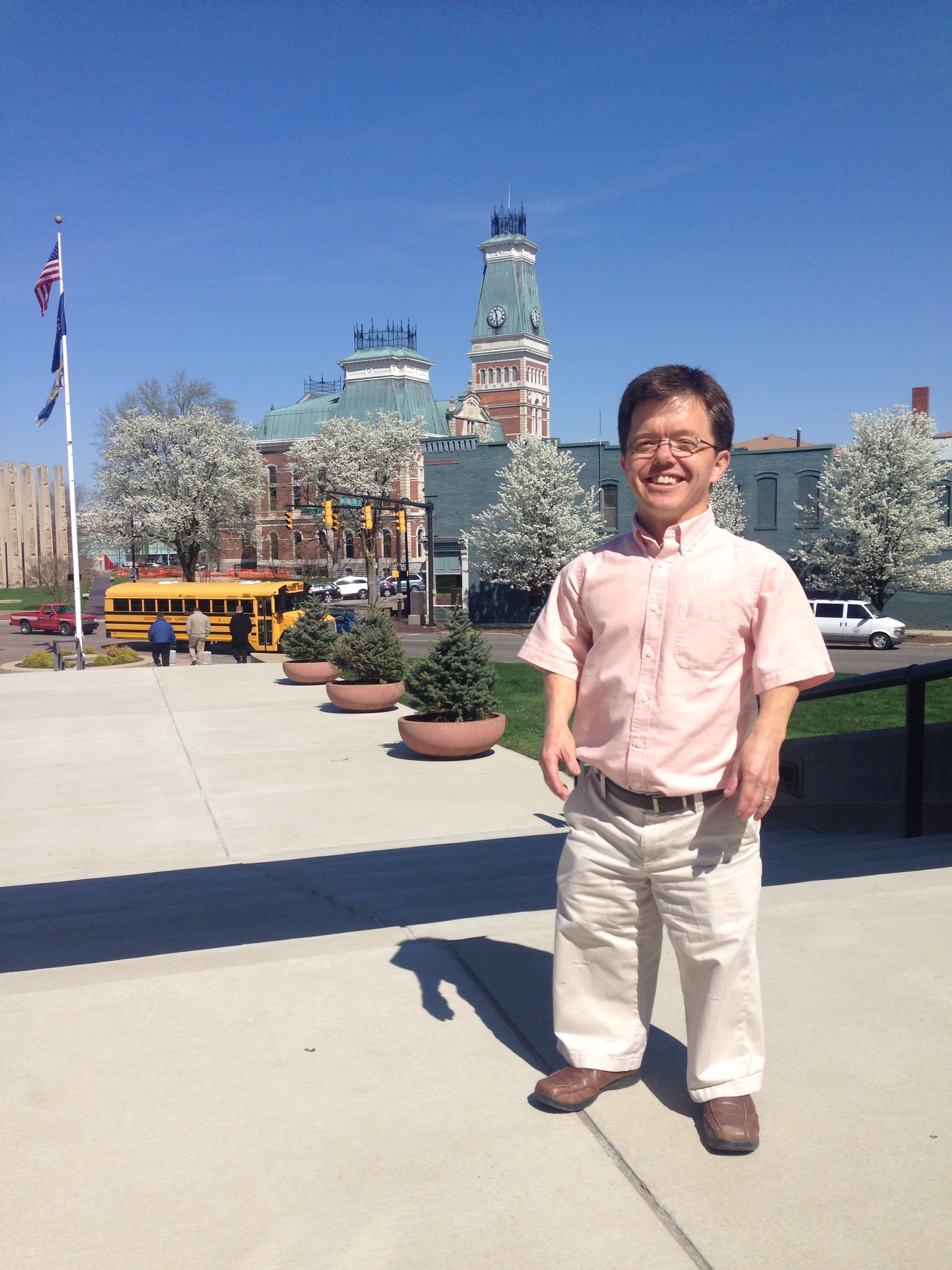
- Dwarfism is one of the symptoms of this disorder
- Specialty: Medical genetics
- Prevention: None

Familial dwarfism and painful muscle spasms is a very rare genetic disorder which is characterized by moderate-severe short stature, painful muscle spasms of the limbs and torso, thin, sparse scalp hair, complete absence of body hair, large, low-set ears, broad nose, high-pitched voice, heart ventricle hypertrophy, and high fasting glucose levels. These symptoms usually begin in early childhood. It has been described in two members from a family from Northern Argentina, although the number of affected members could be higher, since the only proof of more family members with the disorder (to be more specific, a double first cousin and the father of the patients) was an oral confirmation from the patients. The double first cousin and father were not examined.
