= Gender disparity in law enforcement employment =

Policing has always been dominated by men while being constructed to gain privileges easily throughout history, but meanwhile, women in policing have been physically and symbolically excluded every time. Male and female officers have always faced different treatments in law enforcement due to the fact that law enforcement is considered a male-dominated field and has a very deep-rooted toxic masculine work culture. In law enforcement, female officers are frequently given roles in community policing, while, on the other hand male officers are more prioritized for aggressive patrols showing the how bias exists in police culture. Female officers have always experienced gender bias, sexual harassment, and stereotypes that underestimate their potential or makes them feel undervalued.

== Promotions ==
Women are heavily underrepresented when it comes to leadership roles, especially when their male peers are given more freedom and opportunities in specialized units. On the other hand, male officers are promoted to higher ranks at a faster rate than female officers. According to a study, nationwide only 10% of women hold supervisory positions and less than 2% of women hold top executive leadership positions in policing. Recent data indicates that for every 100 male officers gets promoted, about 72 female officers get promoted. Women should have equal opportunities to rank up like their male peers, since women bring effective communication skills, mentorship, leadership skills, and perception of trust. In a male-dominated profession, women are highly capable of de-escalating violent confrontation and avoiding use of excessive force compared to their peers, and women are better at addressing violence against other women such as sexual assault. Having a female officer in the department increases the chance of violent crimes against women to be reported and reduces the chance for any future crimes like domestic violence or sexual assault occurring.

== Training ==
The police training is identical for women and men but also very different from each other since the physiologically of men and women is different. The training for both male and female have the same goals to achieve and ensuring that they are prepared for protecting themselves or the community, while utilizing different strategies. The majority of academies use the same training method, but they apply adjusted or gender-specific requirements.

=== Females training in the academy ===
Women are more likely to face more challenges when it comes to physical requirements compare to their male peers, sometimes leading to failing the police academy. Women are more like fail the physical requirements given in the standard curriculum, due to the fact the requirements not being appropriate for female physiology. Female recruits are most likely to face attrition rates in physical, firearms, and driving segments. The majority of academies have specific physical requirements for female recruits. In order for female recruits to pass, they must run 1.5 miles, typically from 15 to 17 minutes, finish 15-24 push-ups in one minute, roughly be able to do 25-32 sit-ups in one minute, 300-meter run under 70 seconds, a 15 inch vertical jump, and drag 165 lb dummy. Female recruits often excel in flexibility, endurance, academics, and performing equally or better than their male peers.

=== Males training in the academy ===
Male recruits follow the same curriculum as female recruits, but they face a stricter physical standard focusing on high-intensity physical conditioning. Male recruits must be able to perform a 300-meter run under 68 seconds, minimum of 30 push-ups or more under 1 minute, minimum of 30 sit-ups or more under 1 minute, and finishing 1.5 mile run under 14.24 minutes. When it comes to male recruits, the police academy mainly emphasizing the masculine tone with the "touch on crime" approach such as aggressiveness, and emotional detachment. Drill instructors have a higher chance of pushing male recruits to rationalize aggressive risk-taking behavior such as excessive force as part of the "warriors" mentality. Drill instructors believe that rationalized aggression is necessary to fight evil and protect society.

== Burnout ==
Women in law enforcements are more likely to face burnout or stress throughout their career in comparison to male officers. Women face a high levels of levels of harassment, bias, underestimation of their physical capabilities, and a lack of support from their supervisors, which ends up increasing the rate of them facing burnouts or being diagnosed by depression

== Essential assets to community ==
Women are essential to modern day policing since they provide better communication and female officers are often seen as trustworthy and compassionate, allowing to build better relationships with the community. Female officers rely on their communications to de-escalate serious conflicts while avoiding using any excessive force to restrain the individual. Females officers are better at handling sensitive cases like sexual assault or domestic violence, also being empathic toward the victims making them feel safe, heard, supported, and respected.
