= Chest hair =

Hair that develops during puberty

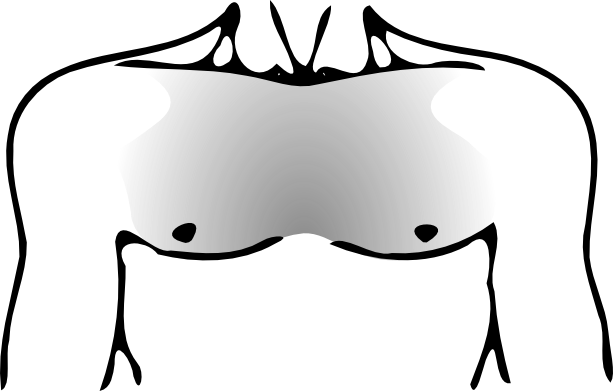
Most common chest hair pattern

Chest hair is hair that grows on the chest in the region between the neck and the abdomen. Chest hair develops during and after puberty along with other types of androgenic hair.

== Development and growth ==
Although vellus hair is already present in the area in childhood, chest hair is the terminal hair that develops as an effect of rising levels of androgens (primarily testosterone and its derivatives) due to puberty. Different from the head hair, it is therefore a secondary sexual characteristic. Men tend to be covered with far more terminal hair, particularly on the chest, the abdomen, and the face.

The development of chest hair begins normally during late puberty, usually between the ages of 12 and 18. It can also start later, between the age of 20 and 30, so that many men in their twenties have not yet reached their full chest hair development. The growth continues subsequently.

== Patterns and characteristics ==
The individual occurrence and characteristics of chest hair depend on the genetic disposition, the hormonal status and the age of the person. The genes primarily determine the amount, patterns and thickness of chest hair. Some men are very hairy, while others have no chest hair at all. All ranges and patterns of hair growth are normal. The areas where terminal hair may grow are the periareolar areas (nipples), the centre and sides of the chest and the clavicle collarbone.

The direction of growth of hair can make for interesting patterns, akin to depictions of mathematical vector fields. Typical males will exhibit a node on the upper sternum, the hair above which points up and the hair below which points down. Some individuals have spirals on their upper pectoral regions (several inches from the nipple towards the neck) which run clockwise on the left breast and counter-clockwise on the right.

Considering an individual occurrence of chest hair as abnormal is usually not due to medical indications but primarily to cultural and social attitudes. An excessive growth of terminal hair on the body is called hypertrichosis. This medical term has to be distinguished from hirsutism that just affects women. These women can develop terminal hair on the chest following the male pattern as a symptom of an endocrine disease.

=== Setty patterns ===
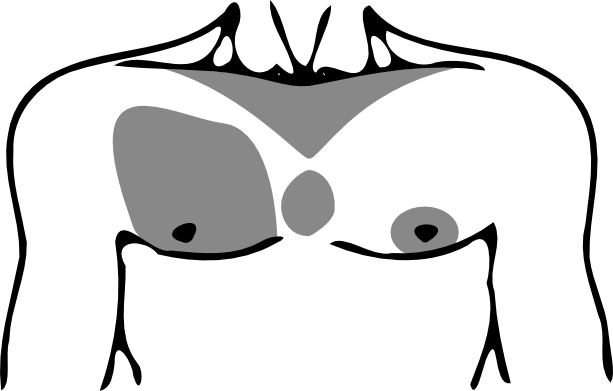
Four areas in the Setty chest hair pattern system: infraclavicular (top), pectoral (left), sternal (middle) and circumareolar (right)

There have been occasional studies documenting patterns of chest hair in men and occurrence of these patterns. A study of 1,400 white men aged 17 to 71 conducted by L.R. Setty in the 1960s defines 15 patterns of chest hair. In this study, four parts of the chest in which terminal hair occurs were identified:

Area	Description	Incidence
Sternal	The center and lower part of the body of the breastbone	74%
Infraclavicular	The area immediately below the medial end of the collarbone;	63%
Pectoral	The breast area, including the area immediately around the areola (nipples);	77%
Circumareolar	A small area immediately encircling the areola.	16%

Chest hair may occur on each of these areas independent from the others, making for a total of 15 combinations in addition to the apilose (bare) pattern. Hair is said to occur on both the pectoral and circumareolar areas when there is hair around the nipples and on the breast, but these areas are not connected.

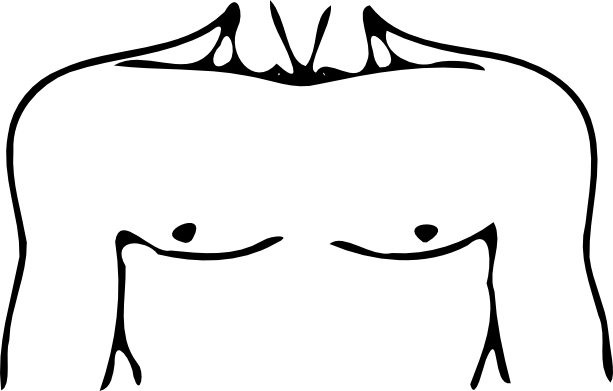
A

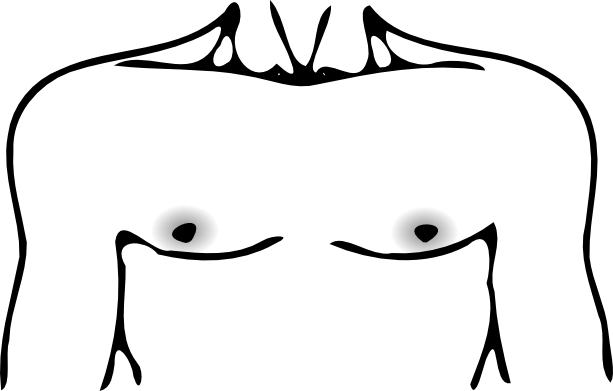
C

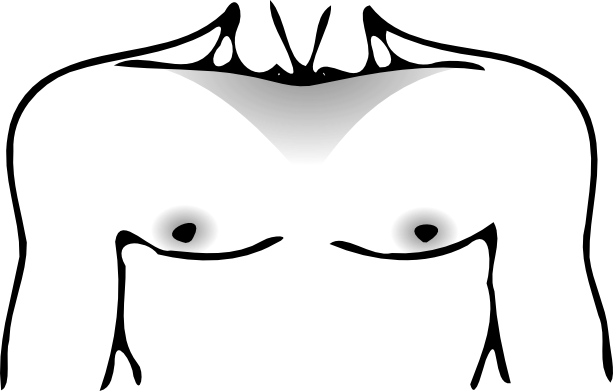
CI

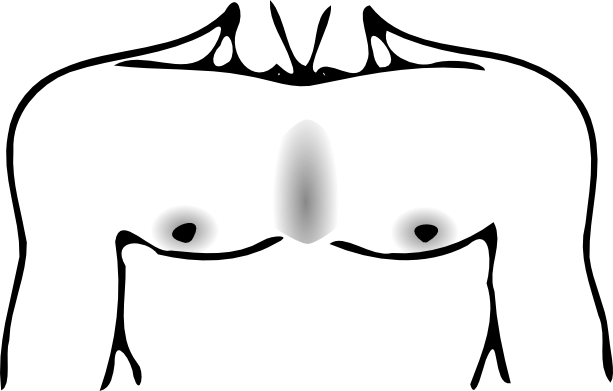
CS

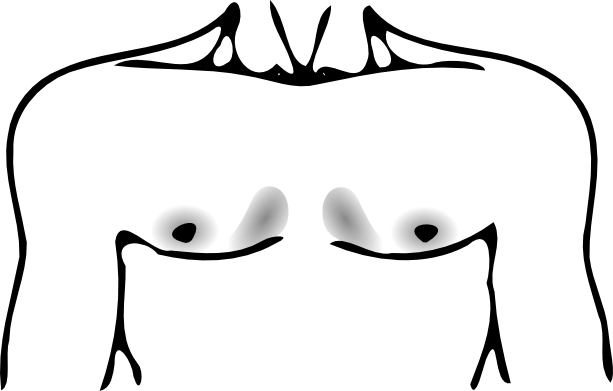
CP

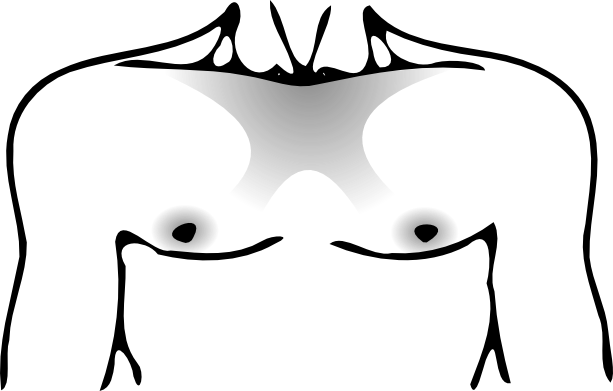
CPI

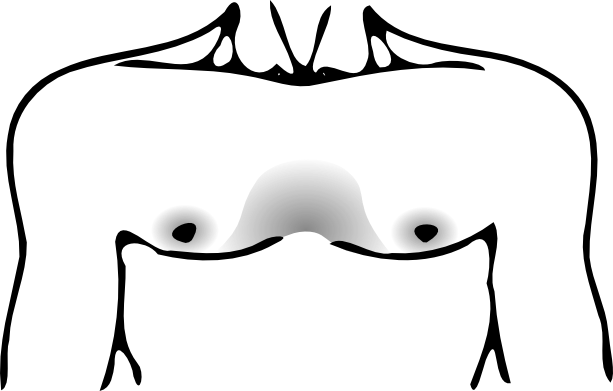
CPS

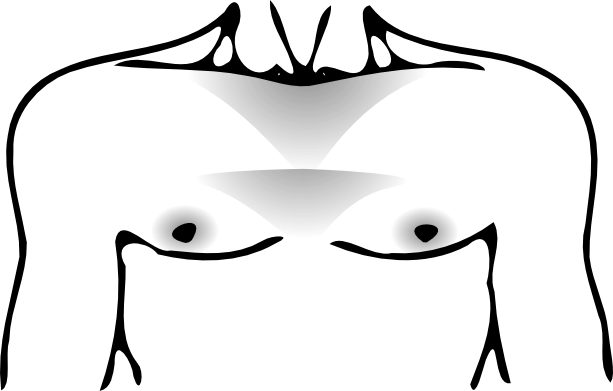
CPSI

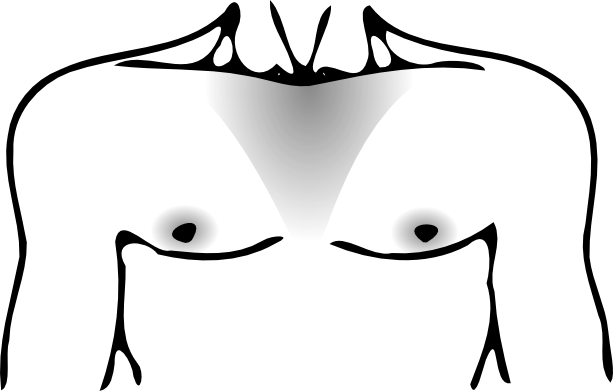
CSI

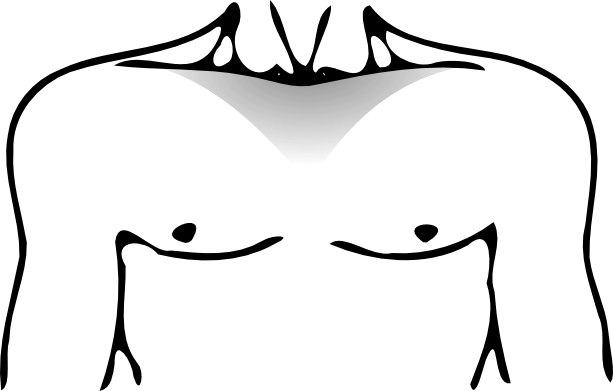
I

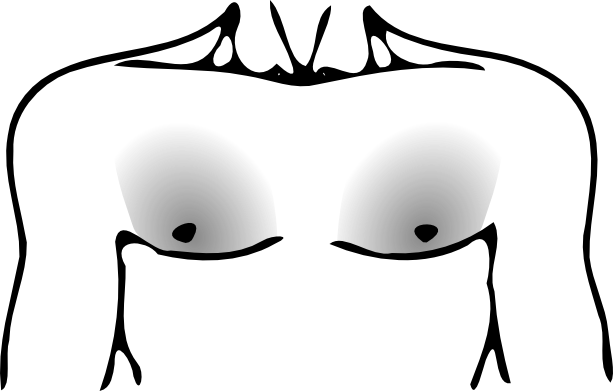
P

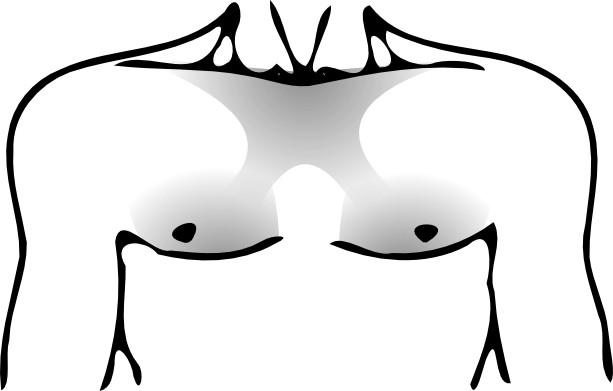
PI

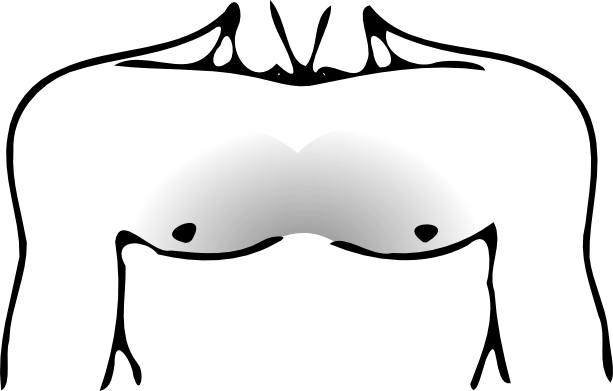
PS

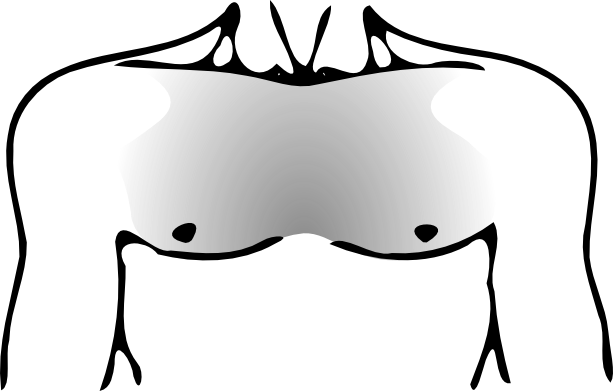
PSI

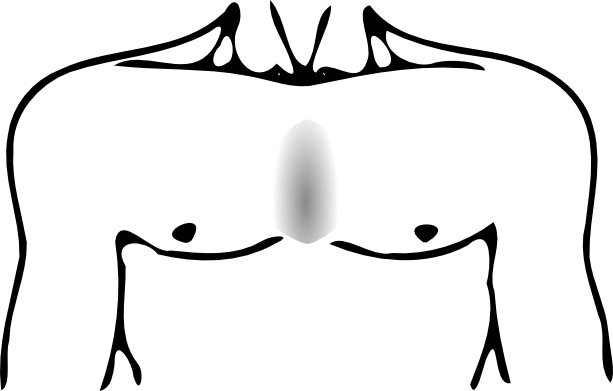
S

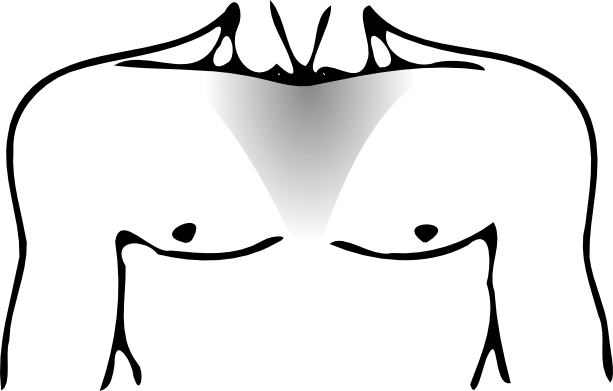
SI

The 16 chest hair patterns by Setty

Pattern	Name	Incidence
A	Apilose	6%
C	Circumareolar	6%
CI	Circumareolo-infraclavicular	1.5%
CP	Circumareolo-pectoral	0.1%
CPI	Circumareolo-pecto-infraclavicular	0.1%
CPS	Circumareolo-pecto-sternal	0.1%
CPSI	Circumareolo-pecto-sterno-infraclavicular	0.1%
CS	Circumareolo-sternal	5%
CSI	Circumareolo-sterno-infraclavicular	2%
I	Infraclavicular	0.5%
P	Pectoral	5%
PI	Pecto-infraclavicular	1.5%
PS	Pecto-sternal	13%
PSI	Pecto-sterno-infraclavicular	57%
S	Sternal	1.7%
SI	Sterno-infraclavicular	0.1%

The pecto-sterno-infraclavicular pattern, in which the breast, sternum and medial end of the clavicle is covered with terminal hair, is most common (57%).

=== Examples of chest hair patterns ===
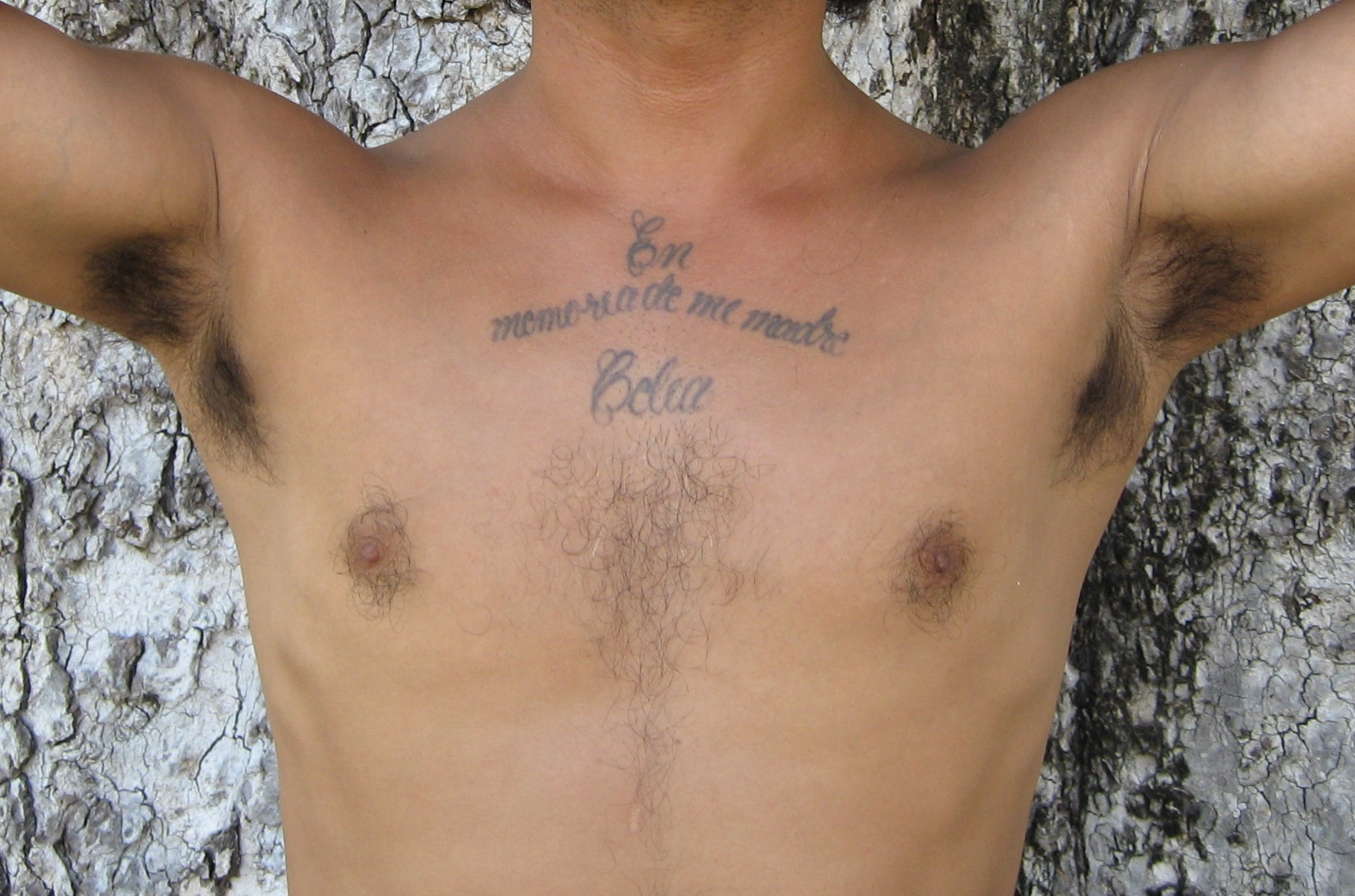
CS – Chest hair primarily on sternum and around the nipples

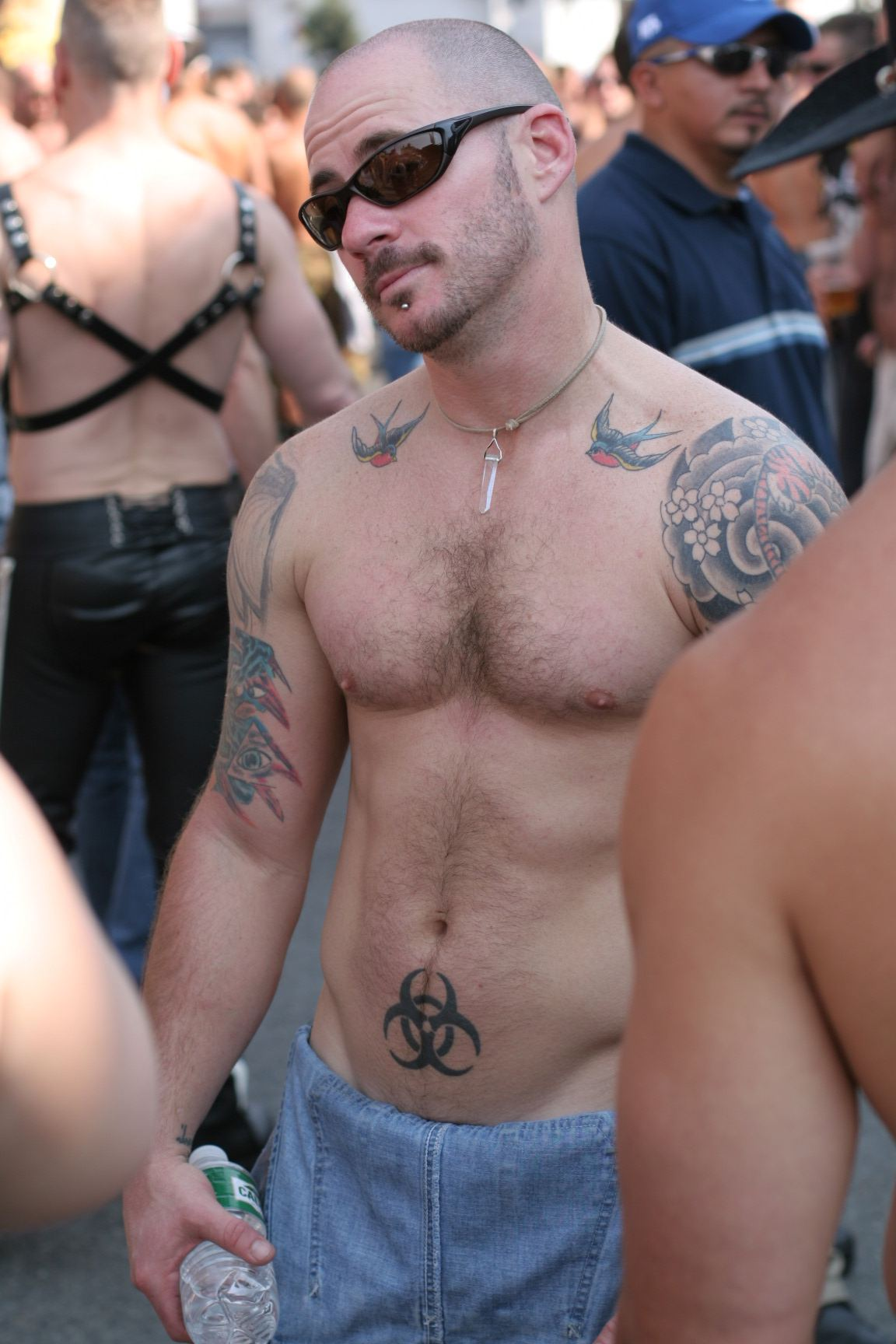
PS – Chest hair on sternum and breast

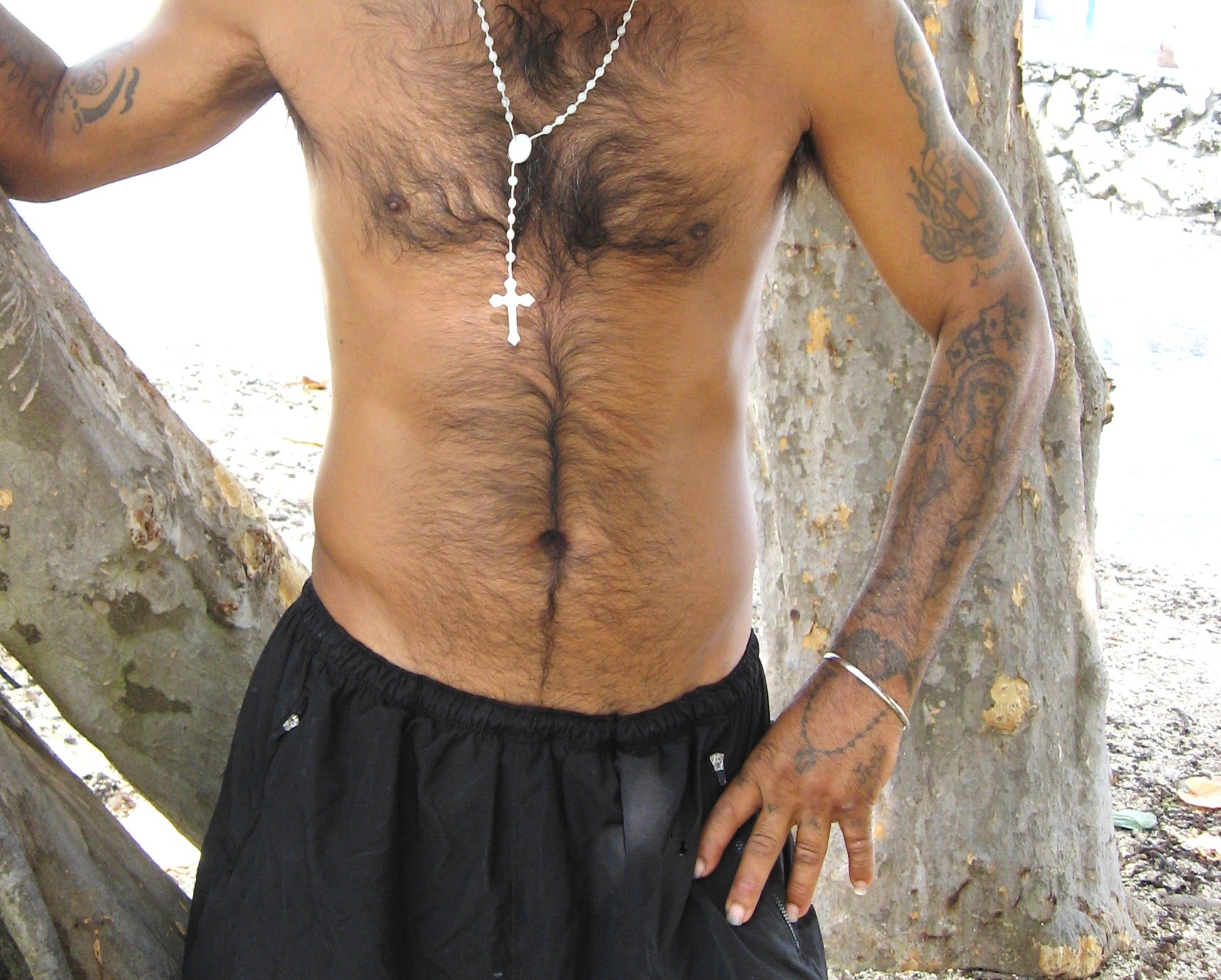
PSI – Hair on sternum, breast and medial end of clavicle

== See also ==
- Abdominal hair
- Hair
