= Markus J. Rantala =

Finnish biologist

Markus J. Rantala (born 1976 in Vantaa) is a Finnish biologist and evolutionary psychologist who is a university lecturer at the University of Turku.

Rantala has a doctorate in both biology and psychology. As of November 2022, he has published 219 scientific articles. Rantala is a public debater, dealing with themes of human mating and mental health. He was frequently interviewed in the Finnish mainstream media in 2022.

In 2019, Rantala's book Masennuksen biologia (The Biology of Depression) was published, in which depression is examined from an evolutionary psychological perspective.
