= Abdominal hair =

Hair that grows on the abdomen

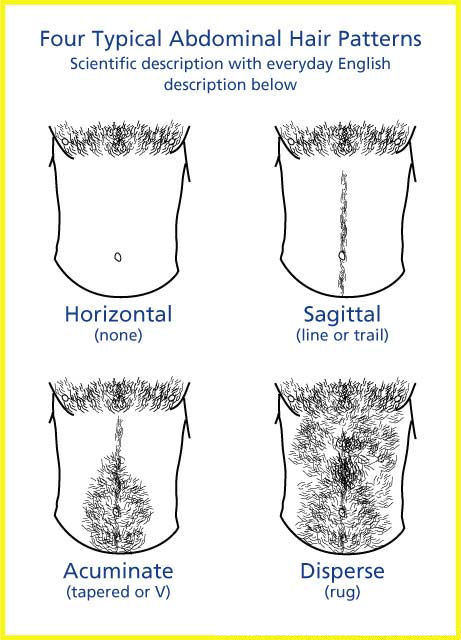
Four typical patterns of male abdominal hair growth

Abdominal hair is the hair that grows on the abdomen of humans and non-human mammals, in the region between the pubic area and the thorax (chest). The growth of abdominal hair follows the same pattern on nearly all mammals, vertically from the pubic area upwards and from the thorax downwards to the navel. The abdominal hair of non-human mammals is part of the pelage (hair or fur).

It connects pubic hair and chest hair.

== In humans ==
Before puberty, the abdominal region of both males and females is covered with very fine vellus hair. In response to rising levels of androgens (mainly dihydrotestosterone) during and after puberty, the skin of the abdomen begins to produce coarser, longer and more pigmented hair (terminal hair). This process primarily affects men. Initially, hair grows in a vertical line from the pubic area up to the navel and from the thorax down to the navel. The development of abdominal hair normally begins in the final stages of puberty. With some men, the abdominal hair will stay within a clearly defined vertical line, but in others, terminal hair will appear laterally as well as vertically, particularly in the area around the navel. This lateral spreading can continue into middle age.

Some women may develop a small line of hair from the pubic area up to the navel. Excessive abdominal hair on women, following the male pattern, is a type of hirsutism.

== Patterns ==
- Horizontal: Characterized by upper surface of pubic hair terminating in a horizontal line with no hair extending to the abdomen.
- Sagittal: Resembles the first but with the addition of a narrow vertical band of hair extending from the pubic hair towards the navel, often slang called a treasure trail or happy trail.
- Acuminate: Characterized by a tapered, inverted 'V' pattern extending upward from the pubic hair. Upper limit may end below the navel, at the navel, above the navel or near the chest.
- Disperse (or quadrangular): Hair is distributed broadly over the abdomen without forming a discrete geometric pattern.

Richard Zickler performed a 1997 study of photographs of the above patterns and their occurrence in 400 white men and 400 white women, paying particular attention to the development of hair during puberty. In Zickler's study the horizontal pattern was most common in females with an incidence of about 80 percent. The acuminate pattern occurred in about 55 percent of males and occasionally in females. The disperse pattern occurred in about 19 percent of the males studied.

== Gallery ==
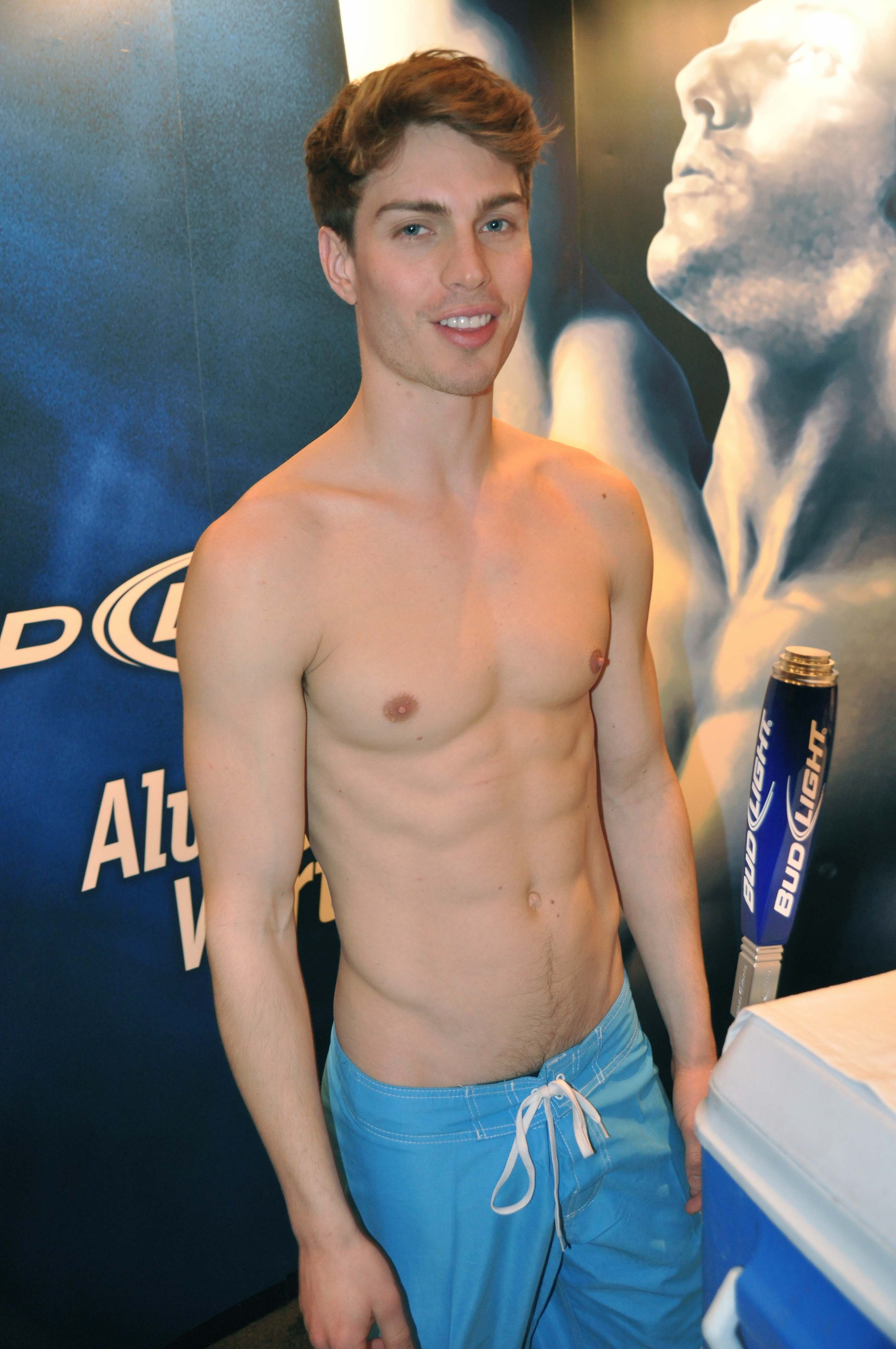
Sagittal hair growth below the navel only

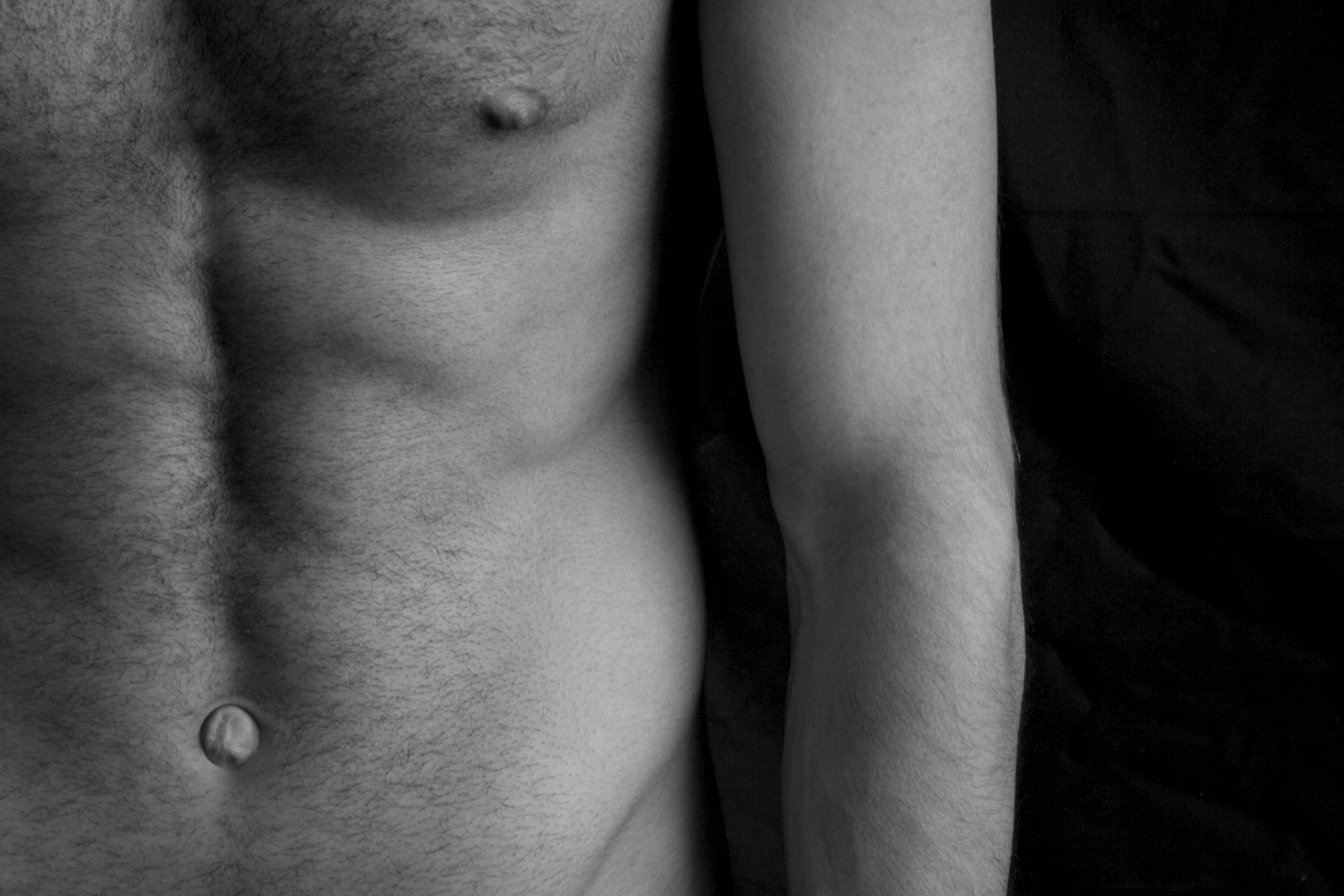
Disperse hair growth on the abdomen

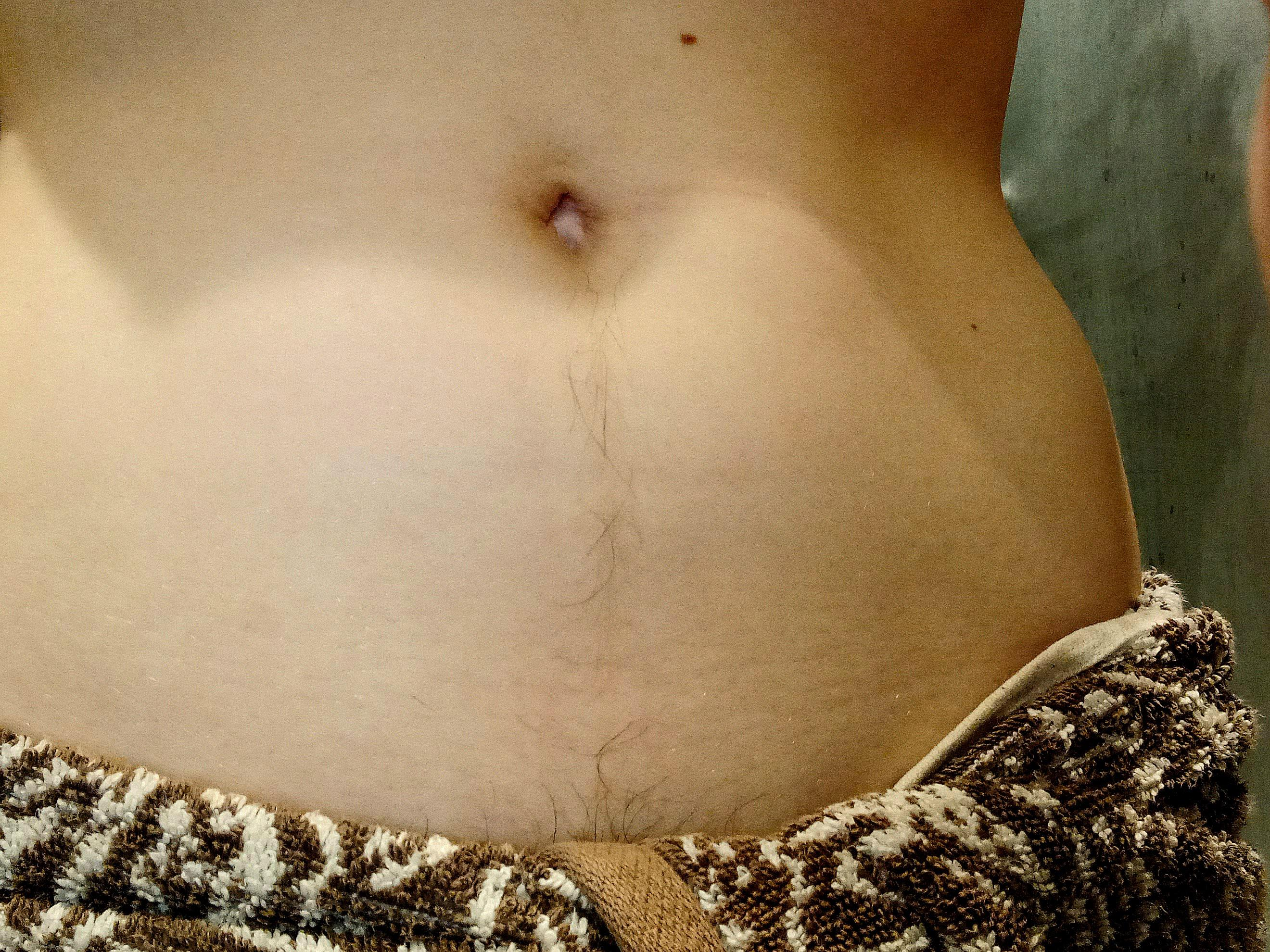
Female sagittal hair growth

== See also ==
- Chest hair
- Hair
- Pubic hair
- Umbilicus
