= Terminal hair =

Thick, long, and dark hair, as compared with vellus hair

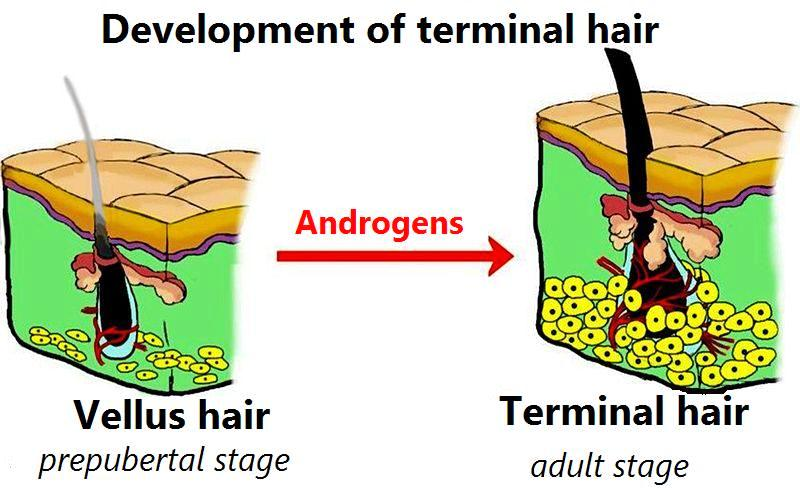
Comparison of the vellus hair (left) to the terminal hair (right) in humans. Notice the presence of subcutaneous tissue on the thicker terminal hair.

In humans, terminal hair is a variant of hair that is thick and long such as that growing on the scalp, as compared with vellus hair, colloquially known as peach fuzz, growing elsewhere. During puberty, the increase in androgenic hormone levels causes vellus hair to be replaced with terminal hair in certain parts of the human body. These parts will have different levels of sensitivity to androgens, primarily of the testosterone family.

The pubic area is particularly sensitive to such hormones, as are the armpits which will develop axillary hair. Pubic and axillary hair will develop on both males and females, to the extent that such hair qualifies as a secondary sex characteristic, although males will generally develop terminal hair in more areas. This includes facial hair, chest hair, abdominal hair, leg and arm hair, and foot hair. Human females on the other hand generally retain more of the vellus hair.

These hairs are present in the large apes but not in the small apes like gibbons and represent an evolutionary divergence.

== See also ==
- Body hair
