= Vellus hair =

Type of short and thin hair

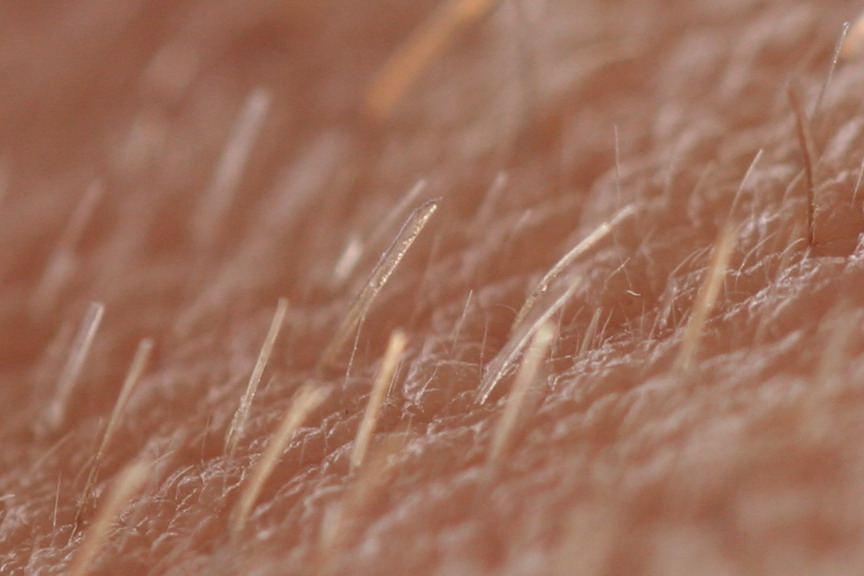
- Vellus hair

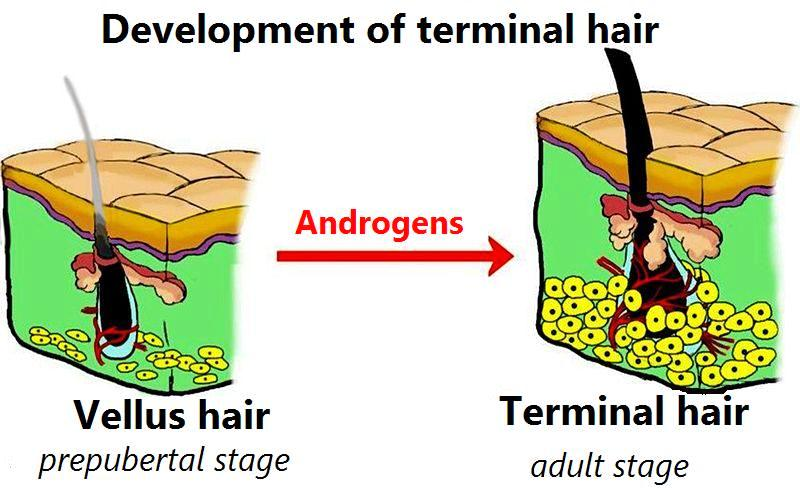
- Comparison of the vellus hair (left) to the terminal hair (right) in humans.

Vellus hair (/ˈvɛləs/ VELL-əs) is short, thin, light-colored, and barely noticeable hair that develops on most of a human's body during childhood. Exceptions include the lips, the back of the ear, the palm of the hand, the sole of the foot, some external genital areas, the navel, and scar tissue. The density of hair – the number of hair follicles per area of skin – varies from person to person. Each strand of vellus hair is usually less than 2 cm (10/13 inch) long, and the follicle is not connected to a sebaceous gland.

Vellus hair is most easily observed on children and women, who generally have less terminal hair to obscure it. Vellus hair is not lanugo hair. Lanugo hair is a much thicker type of hair that normally grows only on fetuses.

Vellus hair is differentiated from the more visible terminal or androgenic hair, which develops only during and after puberty, usually to a greater extent on men than it does on women.

The Latin language uses the word vellus to designate "a fleece" or "wool". Vellus hair is sometimes colloquially referred to as peach fuzz, for its resemblance to the downy growths (trichomes) on the skin of the peach fruit.

== Development ==
Vellus hair replaces lanugo hair on a human fetus at 36 to 40 weeks of gestation. The growth cycle of vellus hair is different from the growth cycle of terminal hair. At puberty, androgen hormones cause much of the vellus hair to turn into terminal hair and stimulate the growth of new hair in the armpit and the pubic area. In males, this change in vellus hair also occurs on the face (beard) and the body.

== Function ==
Vellus hair provides both thermal insulation and cooling for the body. This insulation regulates body temperature: the vellus hair functions like a wick for sweat. While a skin pore is open, sweat wets a strand of vellus hair. The sweat on the external part of the strand evaporates. More sweat wets the external part of the vellus strand and then evaporates. This process is called perspiration.

== Clinical significance ==
=== Overgrowth ===
The unusual growth of vellus hair can be a side effect of some types of disease. An abundance of vellus hair can develop from an increase in the production of the cortisol hormone in a person with Cushing's syndrome. Anorexia nervosa increases vellus hair. Vellus hair can also be found in men with male pattern baldness or with hirsutism. Hormonal fluctuations in pregnant women cause foetal vellus hair to change to terminal hair. The terminal hair is usually shed after the birth of the baby upon the return of the hormones to the normal levels.

- Trichostasis spinulosa – Diagnosed by observing lesions due to multiple tufts of vellus hair located in a keratinous sheath.
- Frontal fibrosing alopecia, a clinical variant of lichen planopilaris, is a female scarring alopecia characterized by progressive recession of the frontotemporal hairline. It is characterised by the absence of vellus hair in the hairline.
- Eruptive vellus hair cyst (EVHC), a benign dermatologic condition in children and young adults.

=== Undergrowth ===
The following conditions may affect growth of the vellus hairs:

- Perioral dermatitis – the hairs may be completely absent in affected facial areas.
