= Sugaring (disambiguation) =

Sugaring is a food preservation technique.

Sugaring may also refer to:

- Sugaring (epilation), a method of hair removal
- The process of collection and production of maple syrup
- A slang term for sugar dating
