= Tweezers =

Tool for grabbing small objects

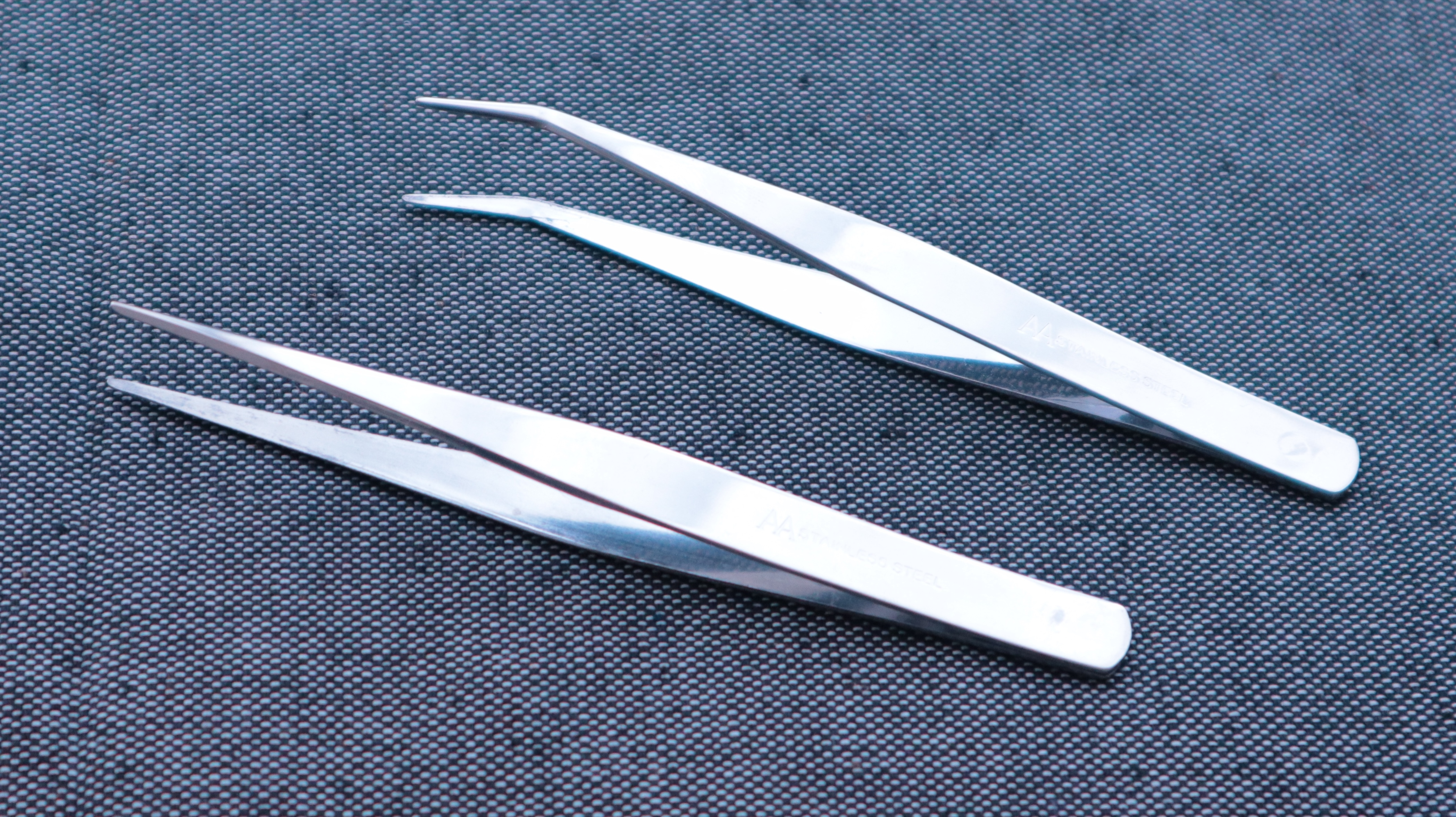
Two types of modern-day conventional metal tweezers with pointed tips

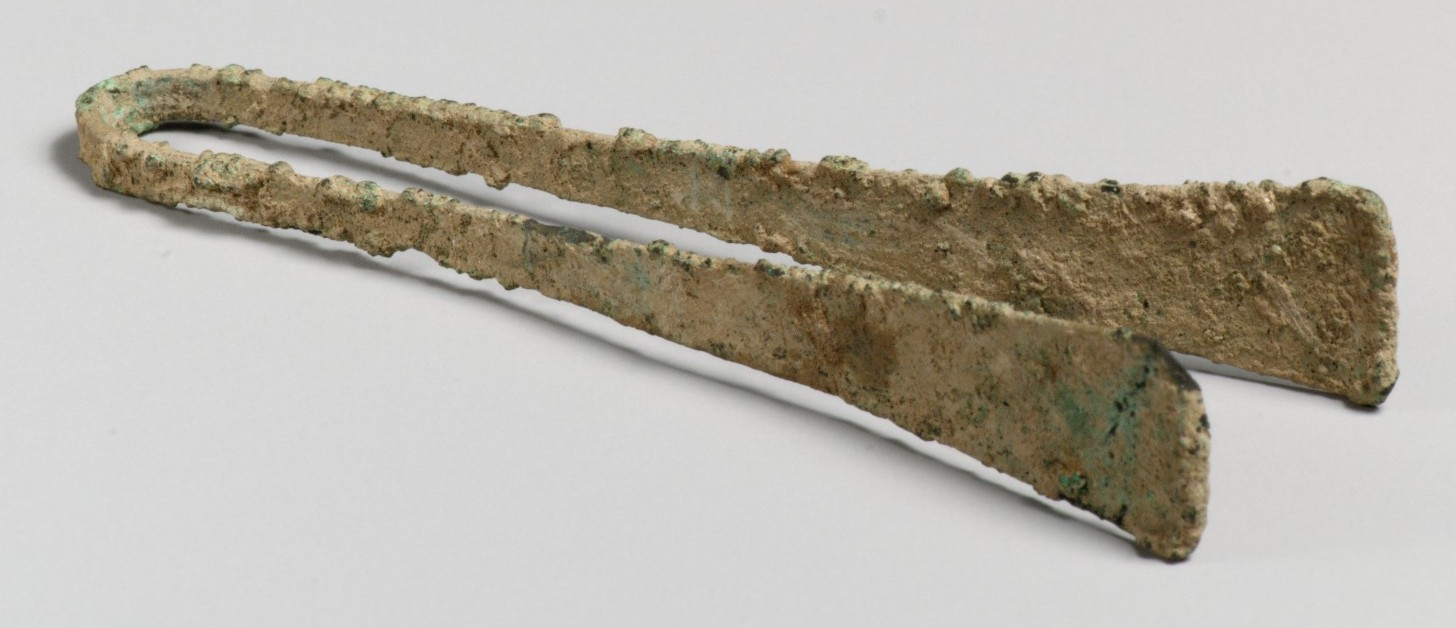
A pair of bronze tweezers attributed to the Minoan civilization, c. 2900–1050 B.C.

Tweezers are small hand tools used for grasping objects too small to be easily handled with the human fingers. Tweezers are thumb-driven forceps most likely derived from tongs used to grab or hold hot objects since the dawn of recorded history. In a scientific or medical context, they are normally referred to as just "forceps", a name that is used together with other grasping surgical instruments that resemble pliers, pincers and scissors-like clamps.

Tweezers make use of two third-class levers connected at one fixed end (the fulcrum point of each lever), with the pincers at the others. When used, they are commonly held with one hand in a pen grip between the thumb and index finger (sometimes also the middle finger), with the top end resting on the first dorsal interosseous muscle at the webspace between the thumb and index finger. Spring tension holds the grasping ends apart until finger pressure is applied. This provides an extended pinch and allows the user to easily grasp, manipulate and quickly release small or delicate objects with readily variable pressure.

People commonly use tweezers for such tasks as plucking hair from the face or eyebrows, often using the term eyebrow tweezers. Other common uses for tweezers are as a tool to manipulate small objects, including for example small, particularly surface-mount, electronic parts, and small mechanical parts for models and precision mechanisms. Stamp collectors use tweezers (stamp tongs) to handle postage stamps which, while large enough to pick up by hand, could be damaged by handling; the jaws of stamp tongs are smooth. Another example of a specialized use is picking out the flakes of gold in gold panning. Tweezers are also used in kitchens for food presentation to remove bones from fillets of fish in a process known as pin boning, and are as tongs used to serve pieces of cake to restaurant patrons.

== History ==
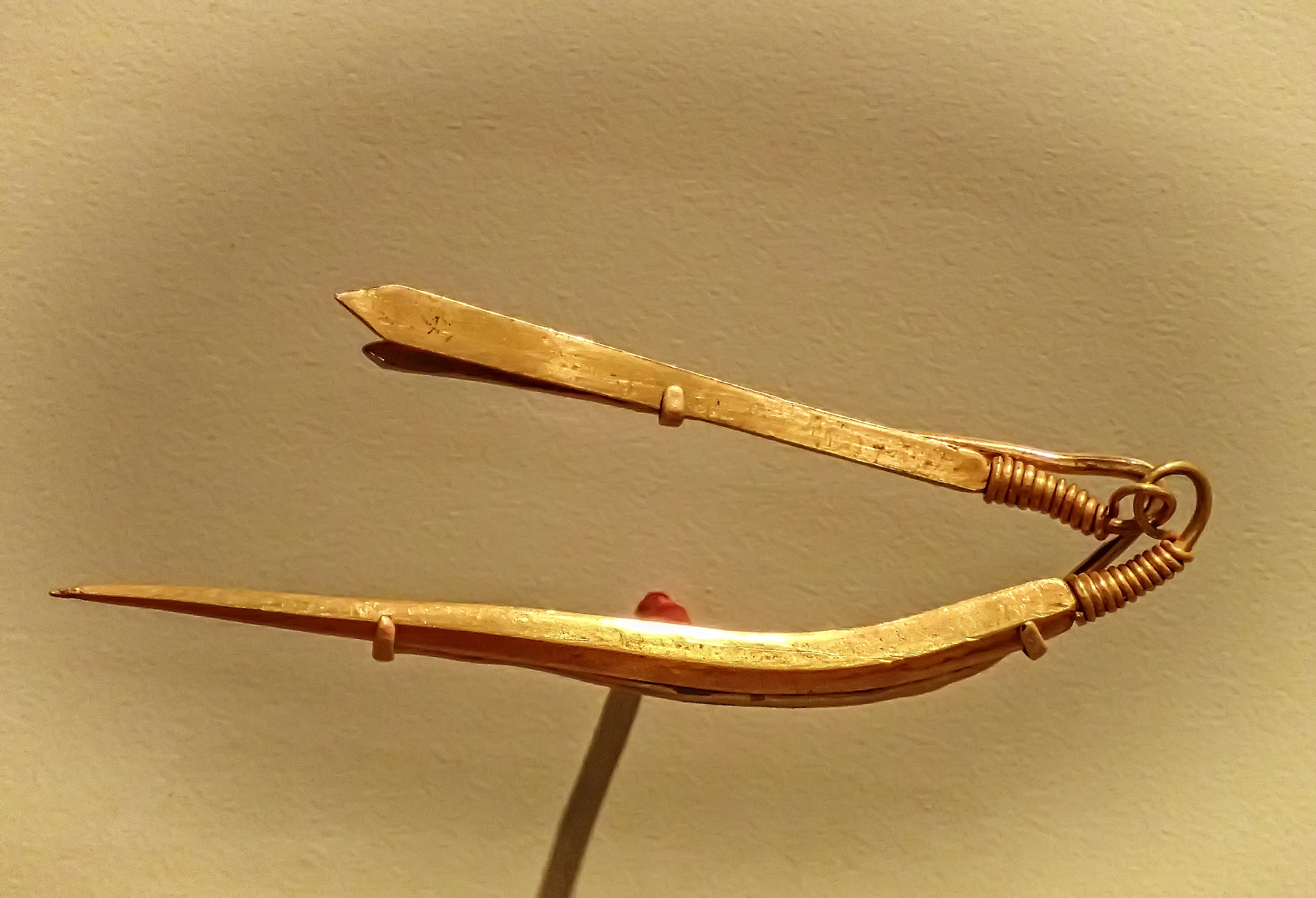
Gold tweezers recovered from the Royal Cemetery of Ur, Iraq 2550-2450 B.C.

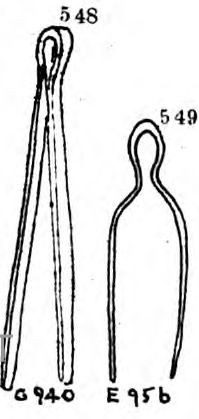
Illustration of Hyksos-era tweezers from Gaza

Tweezers are known to have been used in predynastic Egypt. There are drawings of Egyptian craftsmen holding hot pots over ovens with a double-bow shaped tool. Asiatic tweezers, consisting of two strips of metal brazed together, were commonly used in Mesopotamia and Ancient India from about 3000 BC, perhaps for purposes such as catching lice. During the Bronze Age, tweezers were manufactured in Kerma.

In the 17th century, this instrument was known in Early Modern English primarily as a Volfella, or a Puller, and also known in Latin as an Acantabolus, whilst the name Tweezer was also being used.

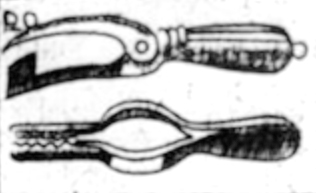
An illustration of a 'Levitor' (top) and 'Volfella' or 'Tweezers' (bottom) from The Academy of Armory (1693)

The word tweezer comes from etwee which describes a small case that people would use to carry small objects (such as toothpicks) with them. Etwee takes its origin from French étui "small case" from the Old French verb estuier, "to hold or keep safe". Over time, the object now known as "tweezers" took on this name because the tool was commonly found in these tiny carrying cases. Eventually, the word "tweeze" was accepted as a verb in the English language.

There is evidence of Roman shipbuilders pulling nails out of construction with plier-type pincers.

== Types ==
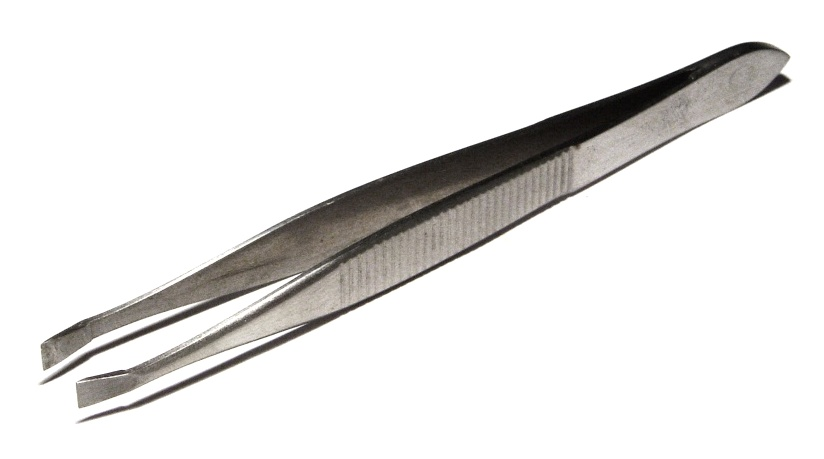
Flat tip conventional tweezers

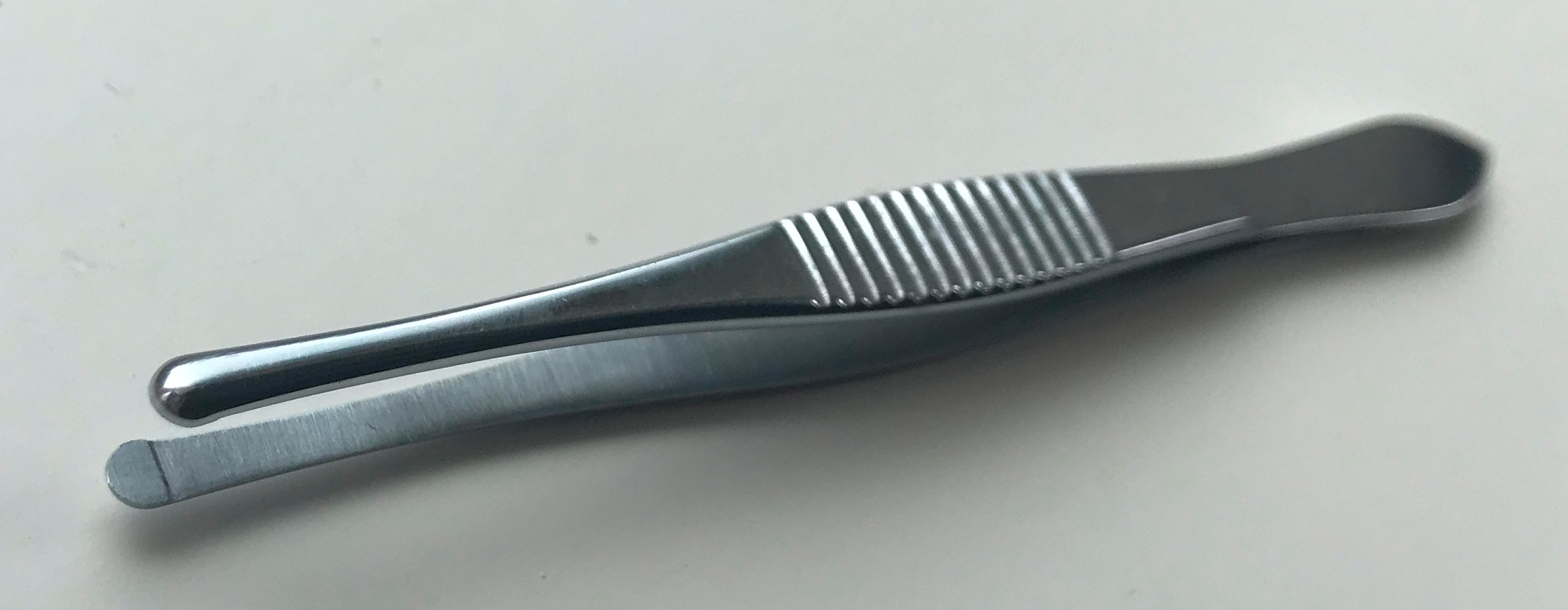
A pair of modern-day round-tipped tweezers

Tweezers come in a variety of tip shapes and sizes. Blunt tip tweezers have a rounded end which can be used when a pointed object may get entangled, when manipulating cotton swabs, for example. Flat tip tweezers, pictured at right, have an angled tip which may be used for removing splinters. Some tweezers have a long needle-like tip which may be useful for reaching into small crevices. Triangular tip tweezers have larger, wider tips useful for gripping larger objects. Tweezers with curved tips also exist, sometimes called bent forceps. Microtweezers have an extremely small, pointed tip used for manipulating tiny electronic components and the like.

There are two common forms of construction for tweezers: two fused, angled pieces of metal, or one piece of metal bent in half. The bent tweezer is cheaper to manufacture, but gives weaker grip. The fused tweezer is more expensive, but allows for a stronger grip. The width between the tips of the tweezers when no force is applied also affects how powerful the grip is.

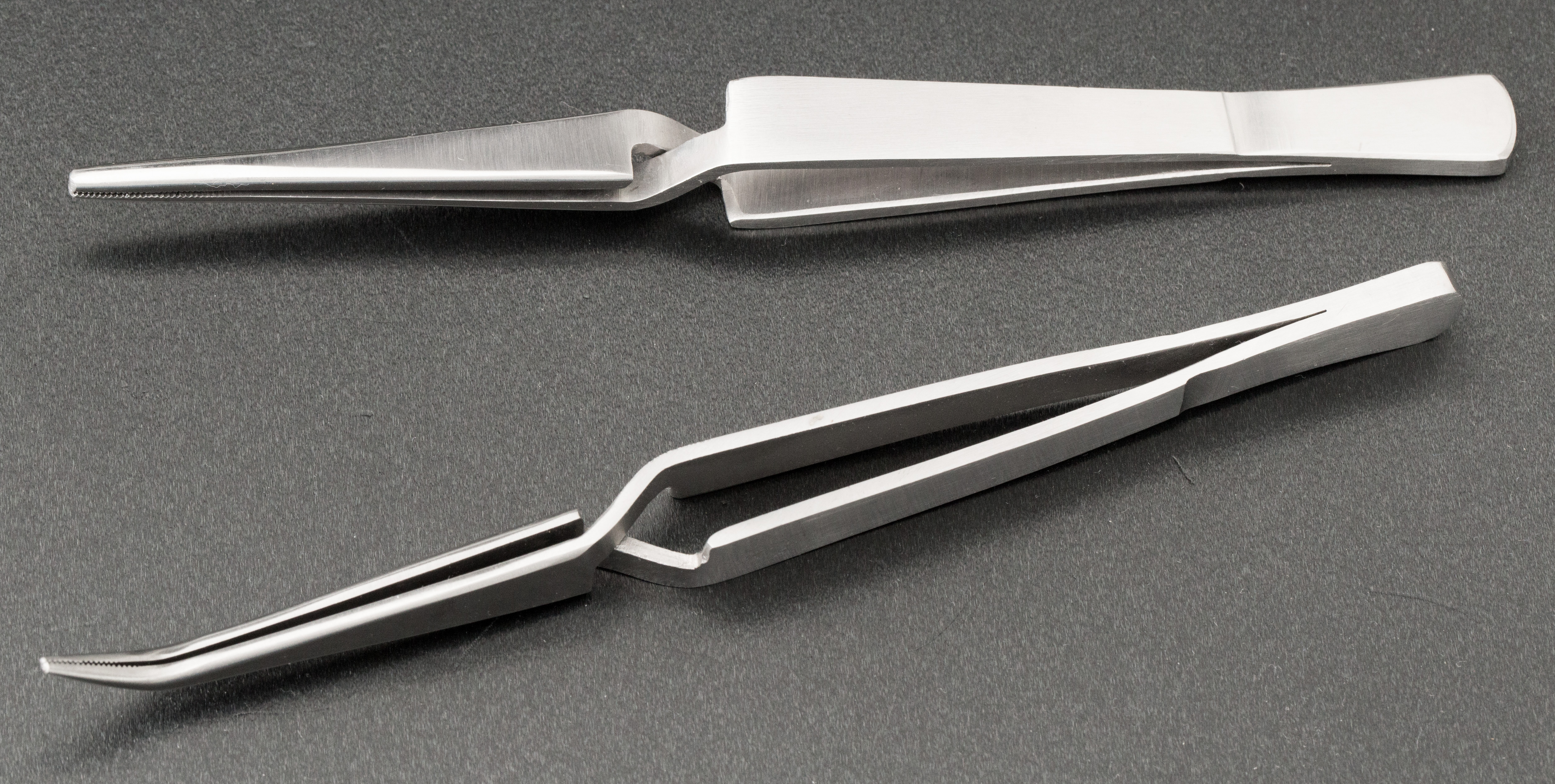
Cross-locking tweezers

Cross-locking tweezers (aka reverse-action tweezers or self-closing tweezers) work in the opposite way to normal tweezers. Cross-locking tweezers open when squeezed and close when released, gripping the item without any exertion of the user's fingers.

== Usage of traditional tweezers ==
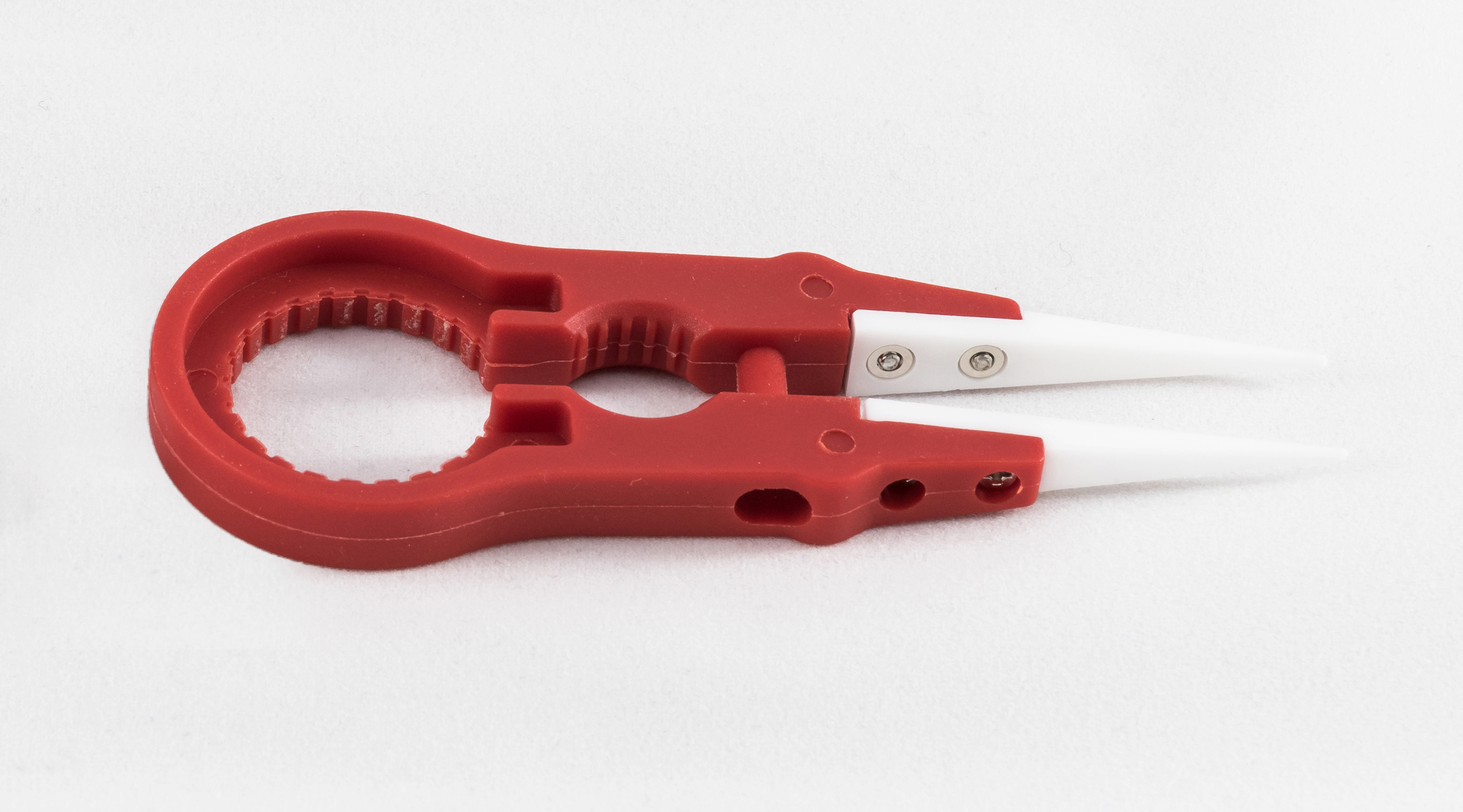
Ceramic-tipped tweezers. Heat resistant and non-magnetic

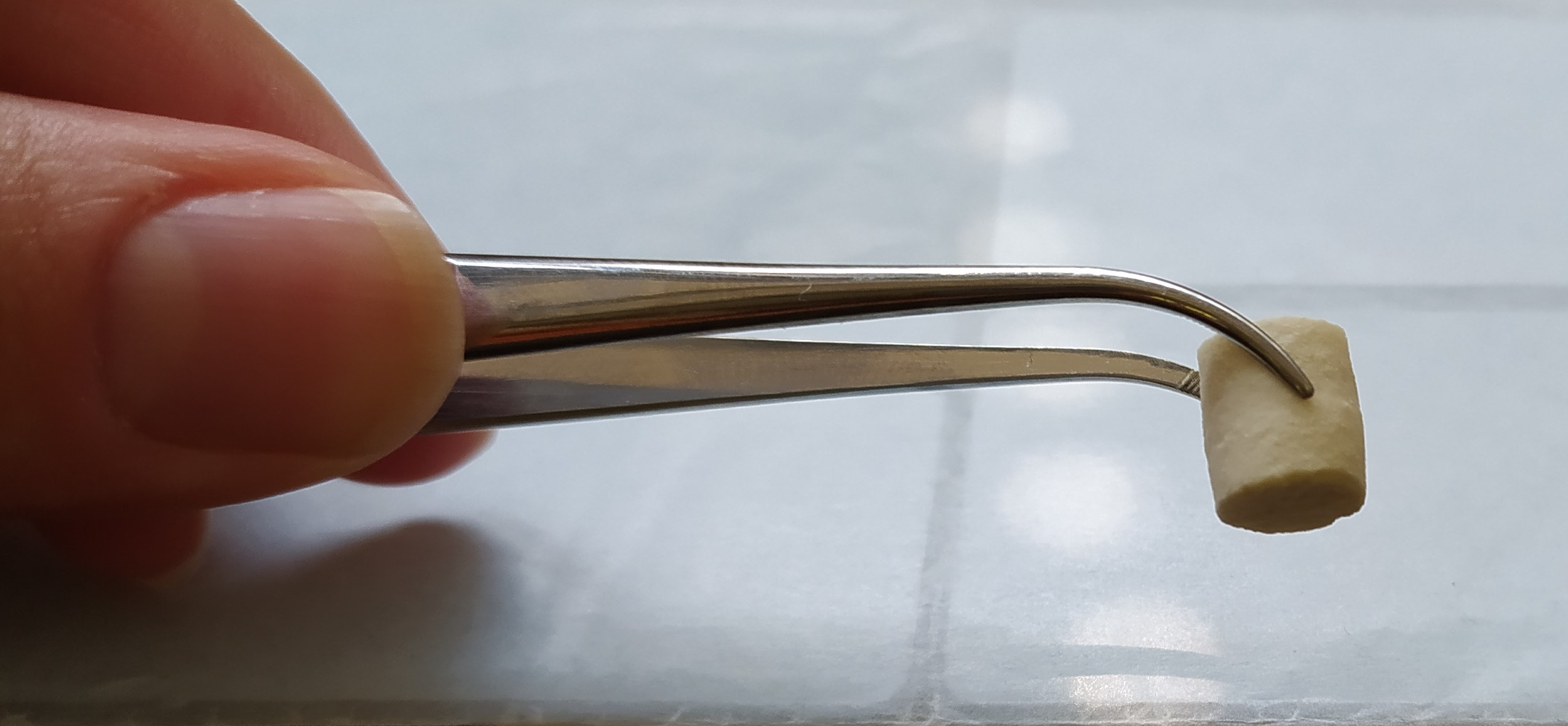
Tweezers in use in a laboratory

Applications:

- typesetting
- dealing with stamps (see Philately)
- dealing with smaller coins (see Numismatics), to protect the coins these are wrapped at the tips with plastic
- electronics
  - soldering
- cosmetics
  - hair removal (eyebrow tweezers)
  - nail art (application of gems, stickers etc. to fingernails or toenails as part of a manicure or pedicure respectively)
- semiconductor technology in the form of wafer tweezers
- medicine (Forceps and Tissue Forceps)
- household
- jewelry making
- textile industry as iron nubs
- science, laboratory
- aquascaping
- watchmaking

== Other kinds of tweezers ==
The original tweezers for mechanical gripping have given rise to a number of tools with similar action or purpose but not dependent upon mechanical pressure, including

- Optical tweezers use light to manipulate microscopic objects as small as a single atom. The momentum transfer from a focused laser beam is able to trap small particles. In the biological sciences, these instruments have been used to apply forces in the pico Newton range and to measure displacements in the nm range of objects ranging in size from 10 nm to over 100 μm.
- Magnetic tweezers use magnetic forces to manipulate single molecules (such as DNA) via paramagnetic interactions. In practice it is an array of magnetic traps designed for manipulating individual biomolecules and measuring the ultra-small forces that affect their behavior.
- Electric tweezers deliver an electrical signal through the tip, intended for depilation by damaging hair roots to prevent new hair from growing from the same root.
- Electrostatic tweezers use electrostatic voltage to induce the redistribution of charges in targeted objects, therefore generating Coulomb attraction force between tweezers and manipulated objects. Electrostatic tweezers work in a trapping mode or guiding mode.
- Vacuum tweezers use differences in atmospheric pressure to grasp items from 100 micrometres in size up to parts weighing several pounds. Special vacuum tweezer tips are manufactured to handle a wide variety of items such as surface-mount electronics, optics, biological material, stamps and coins. They may be used to handle parts that are so small that conventional mechanical tweezers may cause parts to be damaged or dropped and lost.
- Acoustic tweezers use sound to manipulate particles or cells in the fluid. An elegant Gor'kov potential theory is used most for small sizes compared with the incident wavelength.
- Molecular tweezers are noncyclic host molecules that have two arms capable of binding guests molecules through non-covalent bonding.
- Hot, or soldering, tweezers combine the squeezing action of mechanical tweezers with heating, to grip small surface-mount electronic devices while simultaneously heating them, for soldering or desoldering.
- Tweezer probes are a pair of electrical test probes fixed to a tweezer mechanism to measure voltages or other electronic circuit parameters between closely spaced pins.
- Tweezers integrated with an electronic measuring device for evaluation of electrical parameters of small-size electronic components.
- Carbon nano-tweezers have been fabricated by deposition of MWNT bundles on isolated electrodes deposited on tempered glass micropipettes. Those nanotube bundles can be mechanically manipulated by electricity and can be used to manipulate and transfer micro- and nano-structures. The nanotube bundles used for tweezers are about 50 nm in diameter and 2 μm in lengths. Under electric bias, two close sets of bundles are attracted and can be used as nanoscale tweezers.

Other uses of the same principle are named tweezers; although such terms are not necessarily widely used their meaning is clear to people in the relevant field. E.g., Raman tweezers, which combine Raman spectroscopy with optical tweezers.

== See also ==
- Eyelash curler
- Instruments used in general surgery
- Optical tweezers, which use highly focused small lasers and a lens to stabilize atom or cell-sized small objects; the chief inventor won half the 2018 Nobel Prize in Physics
