= Electric tweezers =

Electronic device to permanently remove hair

Electric tweezers are an electronic device intended to permanently remove hair. The design incorporates a pair of tweezers at the tip. A button on the side of the handle is used to simultaneously close the tweezer tips and turn on the high-frequency electrical signal. The electrical signal is intended to cause the connection of the hair to its root to be weakened and to stop hair growth from the root in a manner similar to electrolysis.

Some electric tweezers have been described using the term electrolysis tweezer epilator or tweezer epilator, but their operation is quite different from that of epilators.

The US FDA has a definition of permanent hair removal, which these devices have been unable to meet. The FDA definition is such that a device can qualify and yet be ineffective for some people.

Plucking (tweezing) is often described as time consuming. Because the tweezers operate on only one hair at a time and it requires several seconds of application on each hair, this technique is even slower than normal tweezing. The US FDA suggests that, because of the difficulty of using these devices, many people end up effectively only using them as tweezers, with no permanent hair removal.
