= Threading (epilation) =

Method of hair removal

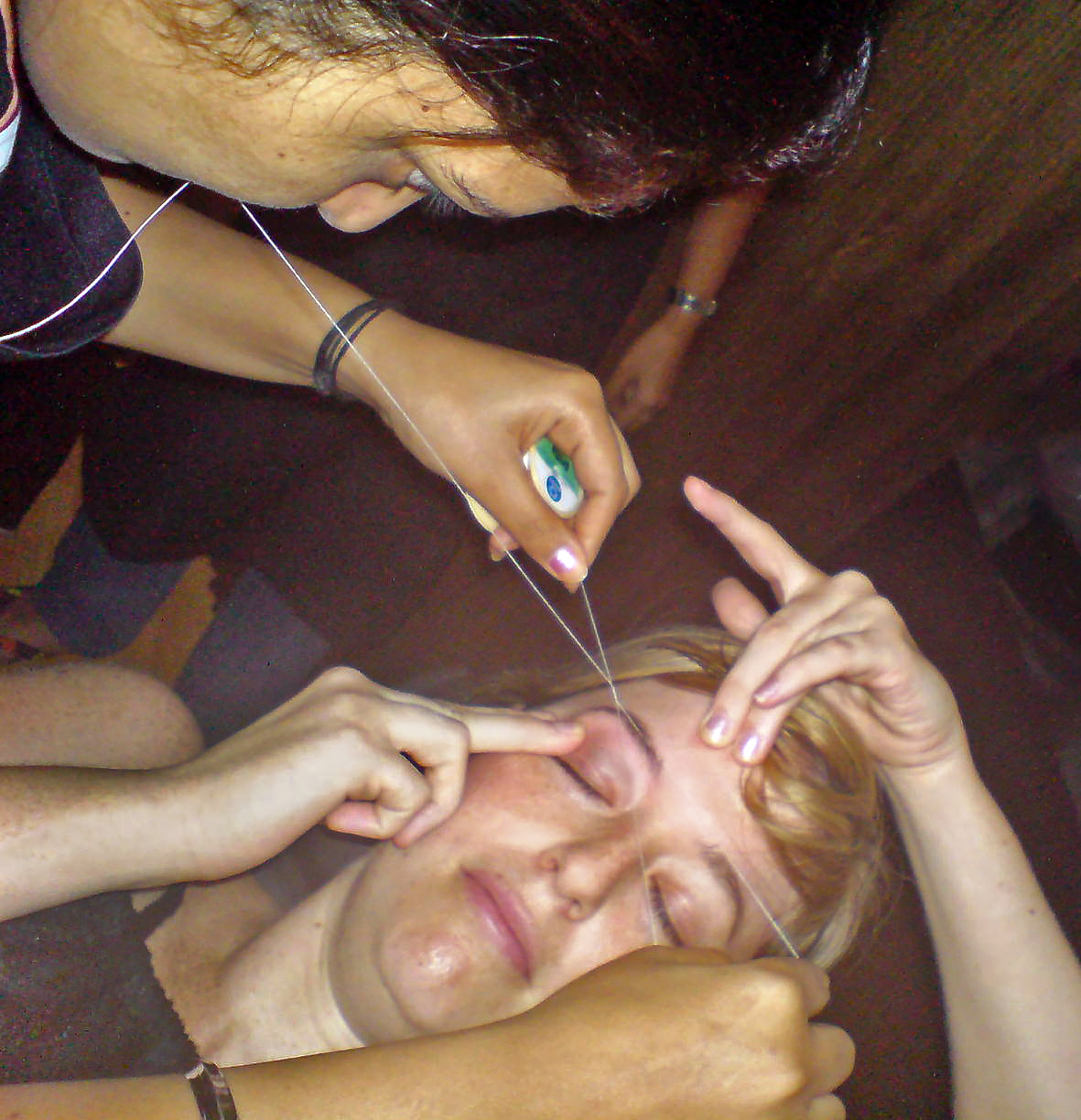
Eyebrow threading

Threading is a method of hair removal originating in India and Iran. It has gained popularity in Western countries, especially with a cosmetic application (particularly for shaping eyebrows).

== Technique ==
In threading, a thin cotton or polyester thread is doubled, then twisted. It is then rolled over areas of unwanted hair, plucking the hair at the follicle level. Unlike tweezing, where single hairs are pulled out one at a time, threading can remove short rows of hair.

Advantages cited for eyebrow threading, as opposed to eyebrow waxing, include that it provides more precise control in shaping eyebrows, and that it is gentler on the skin. A disadvantage is that it can be painful, as several hairs are removed at once; however, it can be minimized if done correctly, i.e. with the right pressure.

Man having his eyebrows threaded

There are different techniques for threading: the hand method, mouth method, and neck method. Each technique has advantages and disadvantages; however, the mouth method is the fastest and most precise.

Threading allows for a more defined and precise shape and can create better definition for eyebrows. It is also used as a method of removing unwanted hair on the entire face and upper lip area. Threading is not a good method for removing hair on arms or legs, as the hair in those regions is typically quite coarse and there is too much to remove.

== History ==
Eyebrow threading is a centuries-old technique that began in the Middle East and South Asia. In some countries, it signified rites of passages such as preparation for marriage.

In Taiwan, before Lunar New Year, women traditionally undergo facial threading (挽面). Facial threading symbolize a fresh start, hoping to welcome the busy festive season with a refreshed appearance.

The practice was largely popularised through the work of Iranian beautician Parastu Amiri, who introduced the technique in Germany during the 1980s, from where it subsequently disseminated across Europe. Similarly, in the United States, threading began in the late 1980s, when immigrants from the Middle East and South Asia began setting up threading studios in large American cities. It has increased in popularity since then. According to The Guardian, in the United Kingdom, online searches for threading services increased by 50% in 2015.

== Bibliography ==
- Verma, S. B. (2009). "Eyebrow threading: A popular hair-removal procedure and its seldom-discussed complications". Clinical and Experimental Dermatology. 34 (3): 363–365. doi:10.1111/j.1365-2230.2008.02920.x. PMID 19021633. S2CID 29042041.
- Litak, J.; Krunic, A. L.; Antonijevic, S.; Pouryazdanparast, P.; Gerami, P. (2011). "Eyebrow Epilation by Threading: An Increasingly Popular Procedure with Some Less-Popular Outcomes—A Comprehensive Review". Dermatologic Surgery. 37 (7): 1051–1054. doi:10.1111/j.1524-4725.2011.02016.x. PMID 21585596.
- Abdel-Gawad, M.; Abdel-Hamid, I.; Wagner, R. (1997). "Khite: A non-Western technique for temporary hair removal". International Journal of Dermatology. 36 (3): 217. doi:10.1046/j.1365-4362.1997.00189.x. PMID 9159010. S2CID 38808124.
