= Stamp tongs =

Tweezers used to handle postage stamps

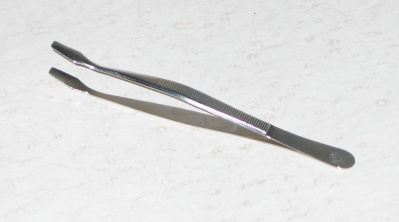
Shovel-type stamp tweezers

Stamp tongs are tweezers used to handle postage stamps. They are used by stamp collectors and philatelists, because they are a reliable way to hold and move stamps without damaging or getting skin oils on them. The jaws of stamp tongs are smooth in contrast to the striated jaws of the type of tweezers one might use to grasp and pull a thorn; such tweezers will damage stamps. They can also be an efficient way to handle a small stack of stamps.

Stamp tongs are nearly always made of metal, with lengths ranging from 10–20 cm (4–8 in). The tip is usually thin, so it can slide under a stamp easily, and may come in several different forms.

The "shovel" tip is a broad spatula shape, often bent at an angle. The "pointed" tip tapers to a sharp point; while useful for precise positioning, as when mounting the stamp on a page or picking a particular stamp from a pile, the sharper tip can also tear a delicate stamp. There are also "rounded" tips available that beginning stamp collectors like to use to avoid damaging their collection.
