= Rebecca Herzig =

American academic

- Title: Professor

Academic background
- Education: MIT
- Influences: Leo Marx

Academic work
- Discipline: Gender and Sexuality Studies
- Notable ideas: History of Hair removal
- Website: https://www.bates.edu/faculty-expertise/profile/rebecca-herzig/

Rebecca Herzig is a writer and professor. She is chair of the program in Gender and Sexuality Studies at Bates College in Maine.

== Career ==
Herzig is the author of Suffering for Science: Reason and Sacrifice in Modern America, The Nature of Difference: Sciences of Race from Jefferson to Genomics, and Plucked: A History of Hair Removal. Herzig’s work on hair removal examines how changing social norms have influenced the “voluntary” pursuit of beauty. Plucked was named best book of the year by The Economist.

Herzig has been on the executive councils of the Society for the Social Studies of Science, the Society for the History of Technology, and the International Committee for the History of Technology. She has received MIT’s Kristen E. Finnegan Prize and Bate’s Kroepsch Award for her teaching.

Herzig is also a regular media commentator.

== Reception ==
Plucked was well received by both academic and popular media. It was named one of Science Friday's best science books of 2015. The Economist called Plucked a “delightful history of hair removal in America,” and The Journal of American History said the book was an “interesting, serious, and meticulously researched contribution to American history.”

== Publications ==
Books

- R. Herzig, Suffering for Science: Reason and Sacrifice in Modern America (Rutgers University Press 2005).
- R. Herzig, Plucked: A History of Hair Removal (NYU Press 2015).

Edited works

- E. Hammonds, R. Herzig, ed. The Nature of Difference: Sciences of Race in the United States from Jefferson to Genomics (MIT Press 2009).
- B. Subramaniam, R. Herzig, eg. Feminist Technosciences (University of Washington Press)
