= Intense pulsed light =

Skin treatment with flashlamps

Intense pulsed light (IPL) is a technology used by cosmetic and medical practitioners to perform various skin treatments for aesthetic and therapeutic purposes, including hair removal, photorejuvenation (e.g. the treatment of skin pigmentation, sun damage, and thread veins) as well as to alleviate dermatologic diseases such as acne. IPL is increasingly used in optometry and ophthalmology as well, to treat evaporative dry eye disease due to meibomian gland dysfunction. IPL is also used for home based hair removal.

The technology uses a high-powered, hand-held, computer-controlled linear flashlamp to deliver an intense, visible and near infra-red, broad-spectrum pulse of light, generally in the range of 400 to 1200 nm. Various cut-on filters are commonly used to selectively filter out shorter wavelengths, especially potentially damaging ultraviolet and longer wavelength infra-red light. The resulting light has a spectral range that targets specific structures and chromophores (e.g. melanin in hair, or oxyhemoglobin in blood vessels) that are heated to destruction and reabsorbed by the body. IPL shares some similarities with laser treatments, in that they both use light to heat and induce a biologic effect in their targets. But unlike lasers that use a single wavelength (color) of light which typically matches only one chromophore and hence only treats one condition, IPL uses a broad spectrum that when used with interchangeable filters, allowing it to be used against several conditions. This can be achieved when the IPL technician selects the appropriate filter that matches a specific chromophore.

== Description ==
Intense pulsed light is the use of intense pulses of non-coherent light over a range of wavelengths from approximately 500 nm to approximately 1200 nm. Linear xenon flashlamps produce high output bursts of broad spectrum. The flashlamp is typically cooled by water flow in a glass tube concentric with the flashlamp. In addition to its cooling of the flashlamp, the water envelope also filters out longer wavelength infrared light that is heavily absorbed in water and could damage the patient's skin that has a high concentration of water. Light generated by the flashlamp is typically coupled to the skin by cooled (in many cases) lightguides which are also used to protect the skin in contact with the device.

Regulations governing IPL vary by jurisdiction. A distinction is sometimes made between beauty-grade and medical-grade machines, mainly to get around regulations.

IPL was invented in 1992 by Shimon Eckhouse who wrote the first patent describing the technology in detail (US patent No. 5,405,368 filed in 1992 and granted in 1995). The first medical use of IPL was aimed at the treatment of vascular lesions and introduced to the medical market by ESC Medical which was founded by Shimon Eckhouse to develop and commercialize the technology. The first FDA approval of IPL for treatment of vascular lesions was granted to ESC Medical in 1995 with additional FDA clearances for treatment of pigmented lesions and hair removal granted in 1996 and 1997 respectively. Use quickly spread to a variety of medical and cosmetic settings. Treatment is generally safe and effective, but complications can occur, such as hyperpigmentation. The polychromatic light can reach multiple chromophores in human skin: mainly hemoglobin, water, and melanin. This results in selective photothermolysis of blood vessels, pigmented cells, or hair follicles.

== Hair removal ==
IPL can reduce hair growth, most effectively in darker, coarser hair. IPL is distinct from laser hair removal which uses coherent monochromatic laser light.

=== Protocol ===
Broad-spectrum light is applied to the surface of the skin, targeting melanin. This light travels through the skin until it strikes the hair shafts or hair follicle. The follicle is usually where the highest concentration of melanin is located. As the light is absorbed, the bulb and most of the hair shaft are heated, destroying the hair-producing papilla. It is also claimed that heat conversion occurs directly in the darker capillaries that bring blood to the follicle.

At any one time, not all hair follicles are 'active', and only active hair follicles can be affected by the treatment. 'Inactive' hair follicles can be treated as they become 'active' over time. For IPL treatments, an average of 8–10 treatments, 4–6 weeks apart, are required to remove most visible hair.

There is no common treatment protocol, as it depends on the equipment used and patient skin type. The area to be treated should be clean shaven and free of sunburn.

Although IPL treatments will permanently reduce the total number of body hairs, they will not result in a permanent removal of all hair.

Certain skin conditions, health irregularities, and medications can impact whether it is safe for a person to receive a light-based hair removal treatment. Photo-sensitizing medications, or damage to the skin are contraindications to treatment. According to Remington, manufacturer of an IPL device, all IPL and laser devices should only be used on light to medium skin tones, and work best on darker hair.

=== Efficacy ===
In August 1997, IPL was reported to have permanently removed terminal hair in two patients who underwent multiple treatments to their beards. In October of that year, the first IPL system developed for hair removal and resulted in 60% hair reduction after 12 weeks.

These studies used a variety of IPL devices on patients with various hair types, skin types, and targeted skin areas. Thus the results are not directly comparable.

According to the FDA, permanent hair reduction means the "long-term, stable reduction in the number of hairs regrowing after a treatment regime." In other words, the number of hairs regrowing must be consistently greater than the duration of the complete growth cycle of hair follicles, which varies from four to twelve months by body location. IPL has been found to be much less effective than laser hair removal; however, many patients experience satisfaction with significant hair reduction.

A 2006 article in the journal Lasers in Medical Science compared IPL and both alexandrite and diode lasers. The review found no statistical difference in effectiveness, but a higher incidence of side effects with diode laser treatment. Hair reduction after six months was reported as 68.75% for alexandrite lasers, 71.71% for diode lasers, and 66.96% for IPL. Side effects were reported as 9.5% for alexandrite lasers, 28.9% for diode lasers, and 15.3% for IPL. All side effects were found to be temporary and even pigmentation changes returned to normal within six months.

A 2009 study evaluated the rate of hair removal after a second generation IPL source. Results found that patients had 75% hair reduction after four months, and up to 80% after eight months.

== Medical use ==
IPL was first developed for vascular conditions. It is at least as effective as pulsed dye lasers and can penetrate deeper with reduced risk of purpura and hyperpigmentation. IPL can also be used for the treatment of dry eye conditions such as meibomian gland dysfunction. IPL can treat pigmented lesions with rapid recovery. Dyschromia can be cleared after repeated sessions. Photoaging treatment has been explored. A series of IPL can be used for facial rejuvenation, improving skin laxity and collagen production. IPL combined with facial injections can be used for dynamic rhytids. Home IPL devices have been developed.

IPL is employed in the treatment of a range of dermatological conditions including photodamage induced dyspigmentation and vascular changes, poikiloderma of Civatte, rosacea, acne vulgaris, sebaceous gland hyperplasia, broken capillaries, telangiectases, vascular lesions (small blood vessels), pigmented lesions (freckles, liver spots, birth marks ), melasma, actinic keratosis, photorejuvenation, basal cell carcinoma, and Bowen's disease (squamous cell carcinoma).

== See also ==
- Electrology
