= Laser hair removal =

Process of hair removal by exposure to laser pulses

Laser hair removal is the process of hair removal by means of exposure to pulses of laser light that destroy the hair follicle. It had been performed experimentally for about twenty years before becoming commercially available in 1995–1996. One of the first published articles describing laser hair removal was authored by the group at Massachusetts General Hospital in 1998. Laser hair removal is widely practiced in clinics, and even in homes using devices designed and priced for consumer self-treatment. Many reviews of laser hair removal methods, safety, and efficacy have been published in the dermatology literature.

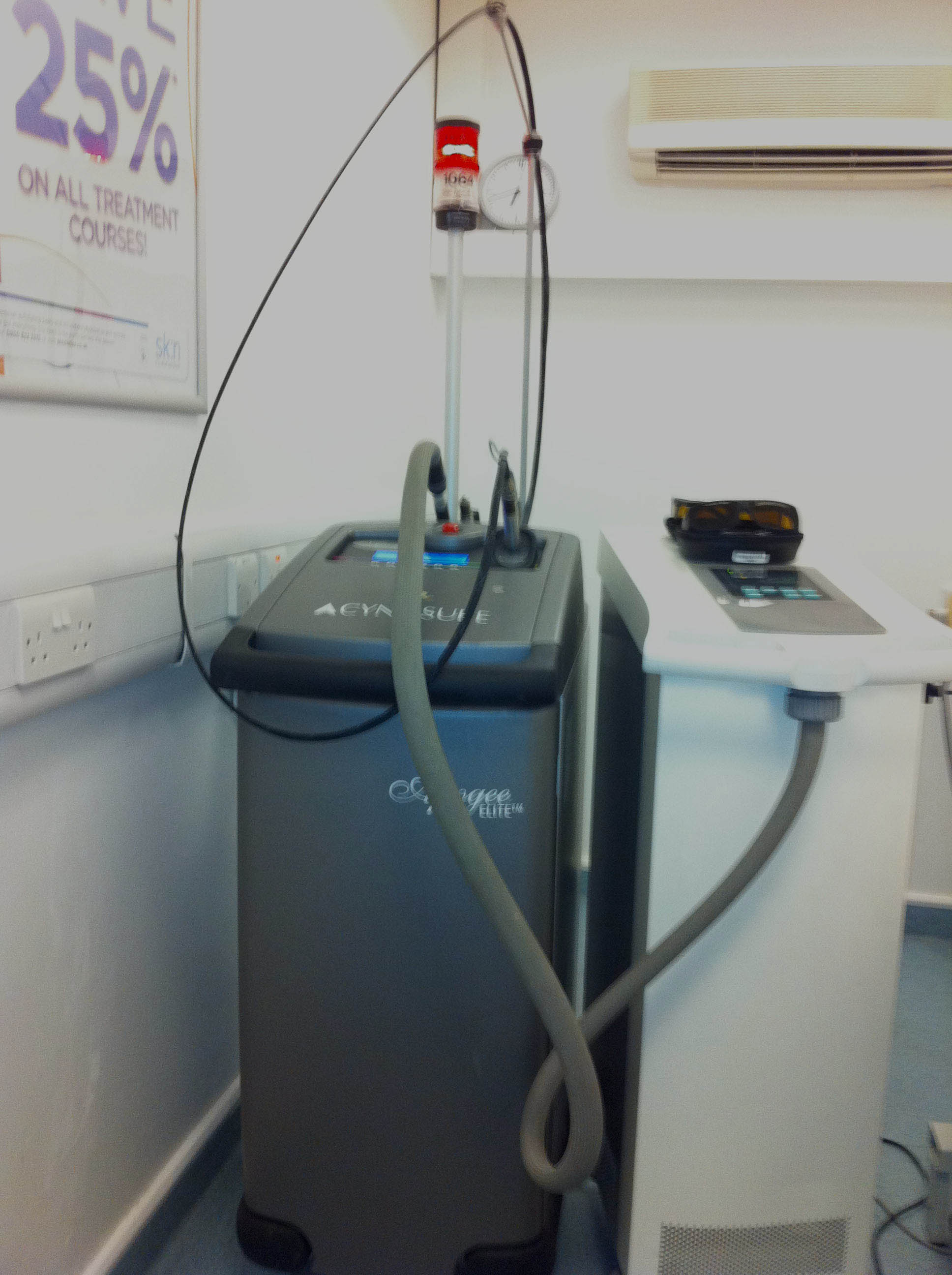
A hair removal laser in 2011

R. Rox Anderson and Melanie Grossman discovered that it was possible to selectively target a specific chromophore with a laser to partially damage basal stem cells inside the hair follicles. This method proved to be successful, and was first applied in 1996. In 1997, the United States Food and Drug Administration approved this tactic of hair removal. As this technology continued to be researched, laser hair removal became more effective and efficient; thus, it is now a common method in removing hair for long periods of time.

== Procedure ==
The primary principle behind laser hair removal is selective photothermolysis (SPTL), the matching of a specific wavelength of light and pulse duration to obtain optimal effect on a targeted tissue with minimal effect on surrounding tissue. Lasers can cause localized damage by selectively heating dark target matter, melanin, thereby heating up the basal stem cells in the follicle which causes hair growth, the hair follicle, while not directly heating the rest of the skin. Light is absorbed by dark objects but reflected by light objects and water, so laser energy can be absorbed by dark material in the hair or skin, with much more speed and intensity than just the skin without any dark adult hair or melanin.

Melanin is considered the primary chromophore for all hair removal lasers currently on the market. Melanin occurs naturally in the skin and gives skin and hair their color. There are two types of melanin in hair. Eumelanin gives hair brown or black color, while pheomelanin gives hair blonde or red color. Because of the selective absorption of photons of laser light, only hair with color such as black, brown, or reddish-brown hair or dirty blonde can be removed. White hair, light blonde and strawberry blonde hair does not respond well. Laser works best with dark coarse hair. Light skin and dark hair are an ideal combination, being most effective and producing the best results, but lasers such as the Nd:YAG laser are able to target black hair in patients with dark skin with some success.

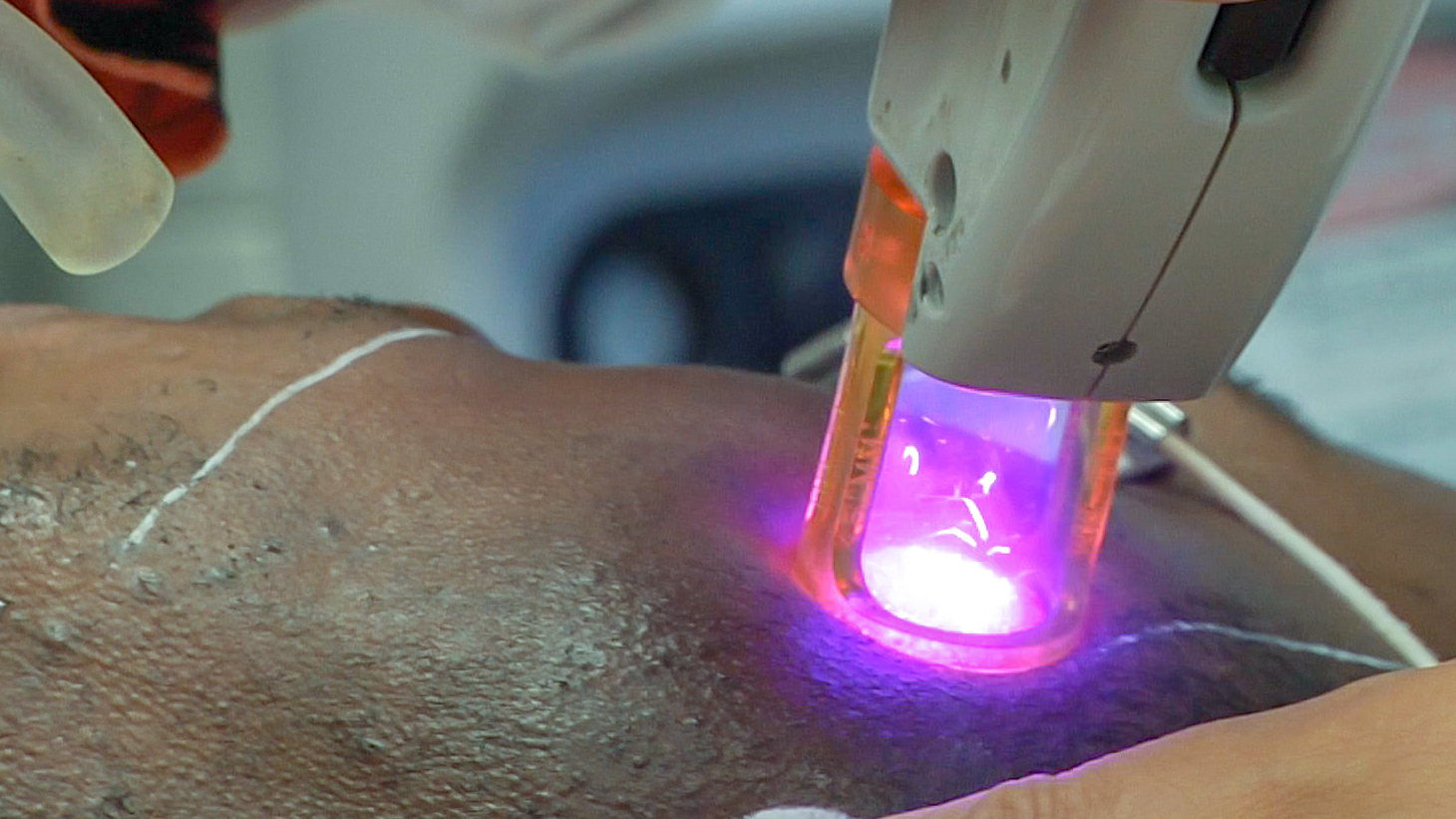
Laser hair removal can be used to treat pseudofolliculitis, common in men who have naturally coarse or tightly curling thick facial hair.

Hair removal lasers have been in use since 1997 and have been approved for "permanent hair reduction" in the United States by the Food and Drug Administration (FDA). Under the FDA's definition, "permanent" hair reduction is the long-term, stable reduction in the number of hairs regrowing after a treatment regime. Many patients experience complete regrowth of hair on their treated areas in the years following their last treatment. This means that although laser treatments with these devices will permanently reduce the total number of body hairs, they will not result in a permanent removal of all hair.

Laser hair removal has become popular because of its speed and efficacy, although some of the efficacy is dependent upon the skill and experience of the laser operator, and the choice and availability of different laser technologies used for the procedure. Some will need touch-up treatments, especially on large areas, after the initial set of 3–8 treatments.

== Comparisons with other removal techniques ==
=== Intense pulsed light ===
IPL, though technically not containing a laser, is sometimes incorrectly referred to as "laser hair removal". IPL-based methods, sometimes called "phototricholysis" or "photoepilation", use xenon flash lamps that emit full spectrum light. IPL systems typically output wavelengths between 400 nm and 1200 nm. Filters are applied to block shorter wavelengths, thereby only using the longer, "redder" wavelengths. IPLs offer certain advantages over laser, principally in the pulse duration. While lasers may output trains of short pulses to simulate a longer pulse, IPL systems can generate pulse widths up to 250 ms, which is useful for larger diameter targets. For hair removal, comparative studies generally show IPL to be effective but with lower reduction rates than diode lasers. A randomized intrapatient trial found 52.7% hair reduction with IPL versus 69.2% with diode laser at 12 months (P<0.01).

A 2006 review article in the journal Lasers in Medical Science compared intense pulsed light (IPL), and both alexandrite and diode lasers. The review found no statistical difference in short-term effectiveness, but a higher incidence of side effects with diode laser-based treatment. Hair reduction after six months was reported as 68.75% for alexandrite lasers, 71.71% for diode lasers, and 66.96% for IPL. Side effects were reported as 9.5% for alexandrite lasers, 28.9% for diode lasers, and 15.3% for IPL. All side effects were found to be temporary and even pigmentation changes returned to normal within six months.

=== Electrolysis ===
Electrolysis is another hair removal method that has been used for over 135 years. Like newer laser technology used properly and with several treatments, electrolysis can be used to remove 100% of the hair from an area and is effective on hair of all colors, if used at an adequate power level with proper technique. More hair may grow in certain areas that are prone to hormone-induced growth (e.g. a woman's chin and neck) based on individual hormone levels or changes therein, and one's genetic predisposition to grow new hair.

A study conducted in 2000 at the ASVAK Laser Center in Ankara, Turkey, comparing alexandrite laser and electrolysis for hair removal on 12 patients concluded that laser hair removal was 60 times faster, less painful and more reliable than electrolysis. The type of electrolysis performed in the study was galvanic electrolysis, rather than thermolysis or a blend of the two. Galvanic current requires 30 seconds to more than a minute to release each hair whereas thermolysis or a blend can require much less. This study thus did not test the capability of all forms of modern electrolysis.

=== Shaving ===
Shaving is a technique in which one removes hair from the skin with a razor. Shaving, however, is only temporary and can lead to irritation of the shaved area.

=== Waxing ===
Waxing is another option for hair removal. This method is an efficient way of removing hair; it is longer-lasting than shaving but not permanent. The ancient Egyptians developed a similar mechanism, sugaring, in which one would mix oil and honey then apply it to the skin.

== Regulation ==
There are several layers of regulation that can apply to laser hair removal:

- Device manufacture
- Practitioner licensing
- Device sales: some may be approved for sales to licensed practitioners or clinics, others may be approved for over-the-counter (OTC) sales

In some countries, hair removal is an unregulated procedure that anyone can do, if they have access to an approved device. In others, only licensed individuals may do so. Some regulations restrict that to doctors and doctor-supervised personnel, while in other cases permission extends to licensed professionals, such as regular nurses, physician assistants, estheticians, and/or cosmetologists.

In the United States, device manufacture and sale is regulated by the Food and Drug Administration (FDA), but there is no federal regulations of practitioners licensing. However, almost all US states regulate for-hire services. For example, in Florida, the use of lasers, laser-like devices and intense pulsed light devices is considered medicine, and requires that in a commerce setting, they can be used only by a physician (M.D. or D.O.), a physician assistant under the supervision of a physician, or an advanced registered nurse practitioner under a protocol signed by a physician. An electrologist working under the direct supervision and responsibility of a physician is also allowed to perform laser hair removal in the state of Florida. However, an OTC device may be used by anyone in Florida, so long as they do not perform laser hair removal commercially.

The FDA has cleared many devices for clinical sales. As of 2025, two diode laser devices have been cleared for OTC sales, the Epilaser, and the TRIA.

== Types ==
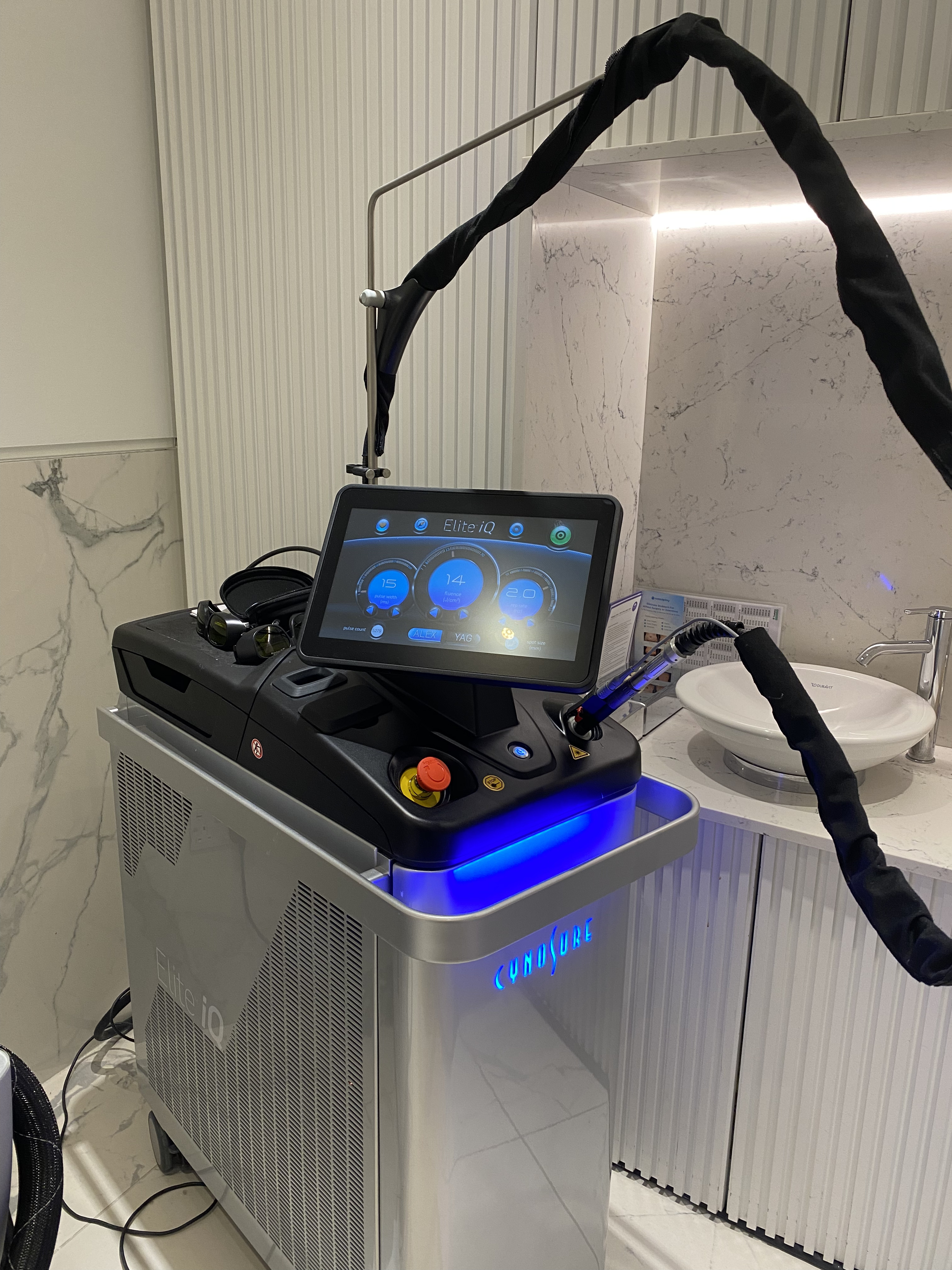
A hair removal laser manufactured by Cynosure

Several wavelengths of laser energy have been used for hair removal, from visible light to near-infrared radiation. These lasers are characterized by their wavelength, measured in nanometers (nm).

Laser type	Wavelength (nm)	Light source	Skin type used on
Argon	488/514.5	Cyan/green	No longer used
Ruby	694.3	Deep red	Pale
Alexandrite	755	Near-infrared	All skin types
Pulsed diode array	810	Near-infrared	Pale to medium
Nd:YAG	1064	Infrared	Dark
IPL	650	Not a laser	Pale to medium

Pulse width (or duration) is one of the most important considerations. The length of the heating pulse relates directly to the damage achieved in the follicle. When attempting to destroy hair follicles the main target is the germ cells which live on the surface of the hair shaft. Light energy is absorbed by the melanin within the hair and heat is generated. The heat then conducts out towards the germ cells. As long as a sufficient temperature is maintained for the required time then these cells will be successfully destroyed. This is absolutely critical – attaining the required temperature is not sufficient unless it is kept at that temperature for the corresponding time. This is determined by the Arrhenius Rate Equation. To achieve these conditions the laser/IPL system must be able to generate the required power output. The main reason why hair removal fails is simply because the equipment cannot generate the desired temperature for the correct time.

Spot size, or the width of the laser beam, directly affects the depth of penetration of the light energy due to scattering effects in the dermal layer. Larger beam diameters or those devices that has a linear scanning results in deeper deposition of energy and hence can induce higher temperatures in deeper follicles. Hair removal lasers have a spot size about the size of a fingertip (3–18 mm).

Fluence or energy density is another important consideration. Fluence is measured in joules per square centimeter (J/cm^{2}). It's important to get treated at high enough settings to heat up the follicles enough to disable them from producing hair.

Epidermal cooling has been determined to allow higher fluences and reduce pain and side effects, especially in darker skin. Three types of cooling have been developed:

- Contact cooling: through a window cooled by circulating water or other internal coolant. This type of cooling is by far the most efficient method of keeping the epidermis protected since it provides a constant heat sink at the skin surface. Sapphire windows are much more conductive than quartz.
- Cryogen spray: sprayed directly onto the skin immediately before and/or after the laser pulse
- Air cooling: forced cold air at -34 °C

In essence, the important output parameter when treating hair (and other skin conditions) is power density – this is a combination of energy, spot diameter and pulse duration. These three parameters determine what actually happens when the light energy is absorbed by the tissue chromophore be it melanin, hemoglobin or water, with the amount of tissue damaged being determined by the temperature/time combination.

== Number of sessions ==
Hair grows in several phases (anagen, catagen, telogen) and a laser can only affect the currently active growing hair follicles (early anagen). Hence, several sessions are needed to damage the hair in all phases of growth and force it to revert to a vellus non-colored small hair.

Multiple treatments depending on the type of hair and skin color have been shown to provide long-term reduction of hair. Most people need a minimum of eight treatments. Current parameters differ from device to device but manufacturers and clinicians generally recommend waiting from three to eight weeks between sessions, depending on the area being treated. The number of sessions depends on various parameters, including the area of the body being treated, skin color, coarseness of hair, reason for hirsutism, and sex. Certain areas (notably men's facial hair) may require considerably more treatments to achieve desired results.

Laser does not work well on light-colored hair, red hair, grey hair, white hair, as well as fine hair of any color, such as vellus. For darker skinned patients with black hair, the long-pulsed Nd:YAG laser with a cooling tip can be safe and effective when used by an experienced practitioner.

Typically the shedding of the treated hairs takes about two to three weeks. These hairs should be allowed to fall out on their own and should not be manipulated by the patient for certain reasons, chiefly to avoid infections. Pulling hairs after a session can be more painful as well as counteract the effects of the treatment.

== Side effects and risks ==
Some normal side effects may occur after laser hair removal treatments, including itching, pink skin, redness, and swelling around the treatment area or swelling of the follicles (follicular edema). These side effects rarely last more than two or three days. The two most common serious side effects are acne and skin discoloration. These typically occur when the laser energy reaches surrounding skin instead of only the hair follicle; some advanced systems are able to electronically identify follicles and aim the lasers narrowly at them, reducing skin exposure.

Similarly, some level of pain may also be expected during treatments. Numbing creams are available at most clinics, sometimes for an additional cost. Some numbing creams are available over the counter. Use of strong numbing creams over large skin areas being treated at one time must be avoided, since it can cause serious harm, and even death. Typically, the cream is applied about 30 minutes before the procedure. Icing the area after the treatment helps relieve the side effects faster. Ibrahimi and Kilmer reported a study of a novel device of diode handpiece with a large spot size which used vacuum-assisted suction to reduce the level of pain associated with laser treatment.

Unwanted side effects such as hypo- or hyper-pigmentation or, in extreme cases, burning of the skin call for an adjustment in laser selection or settings. Risks include the chance of burning the skin or discoloration of the skin, hypopigmentation (white spots), flare of acne, swelling around the hair follicle (considered a normal reaction), scab formation, purpura, and infection. These risks can be reduced by treatment with an appropriate laser type used at appropriate settings for the individual's skin type and treatment area.

Some patients may show side effects from an allergy to either the hair removal gel used with certain laser types or to a numbing cream, or to simply shaving the area too soon after the treatment.

== See also ==
- Depilatory
- Electrology
- Hair removal
- Shaving
