= Epilator =

Hair removal device

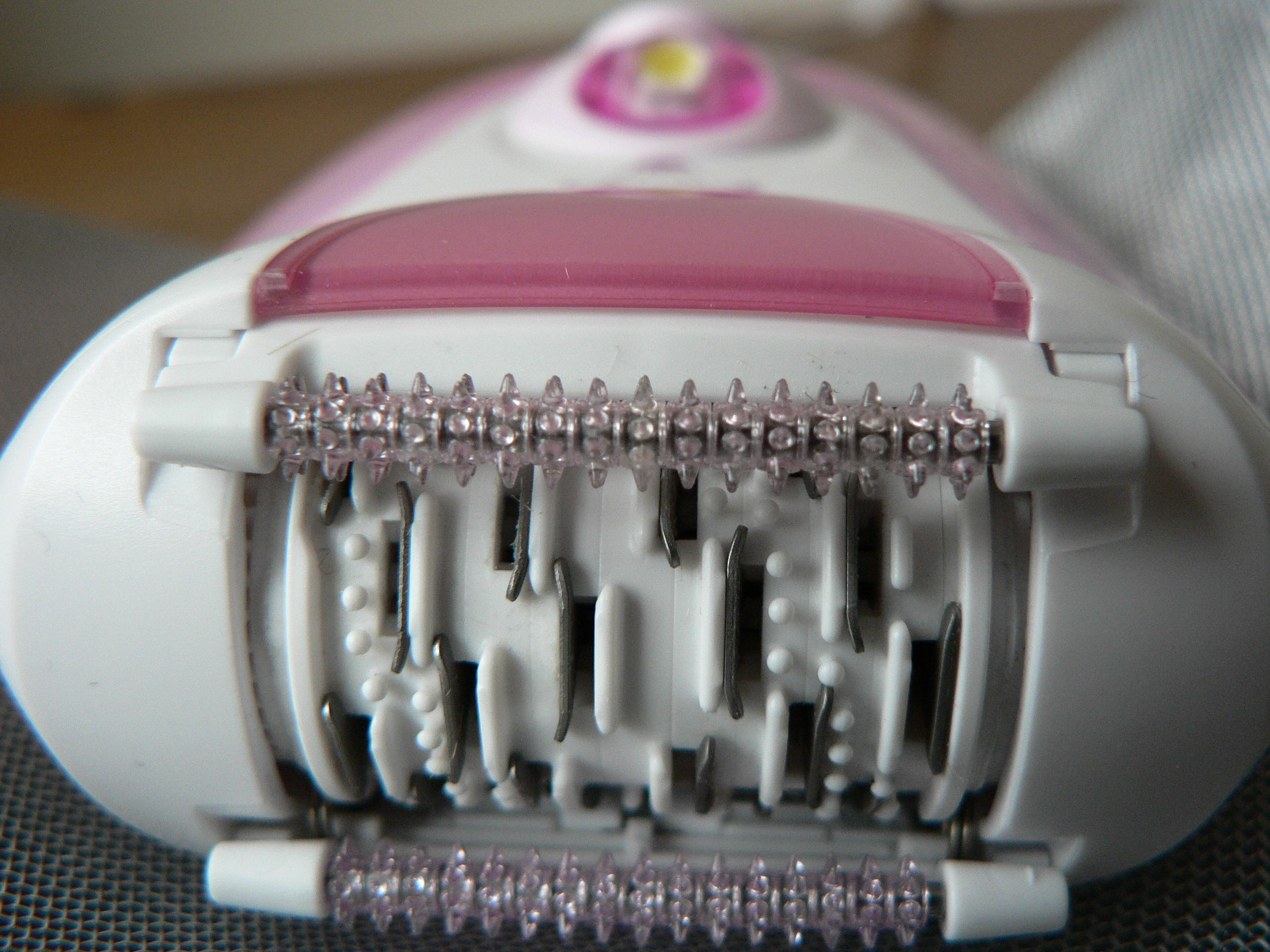
Closeup of the head of an epilator.

An epilator is an electrical device used to remove hair by mechanically grasping multiple hairs simultaneously and pulling them out. The way in which epilators pull out hair is similar to waxing, but unlike waxing, they do not remove skin cells. Epilators may use an electric motor or be manually powered with a spring. They may also come with various attachments, like a smaller head to help with epilation of hard-to-reach areas, or an exfoliation head that may help exfoliate the skin before and after epilation.

Epilation can be painful to some people because, as with waxing, it involves pulling hair out of the roots. Because the first epilation of an area is often especially painful, some people prefer to have the area professionally waxed first, then use epilation to remove regrowth. The most recommended way to undergo painless epilation is by showering the area in hot water for 15–20 minutes beforehand. Pain from epilation is sometimes mitigated by reducing the speed of the device, relaxing the skin with a hot shower or bath, or using a numbing cream on the skin before epilation.

== Types ==
=== Spring type ===
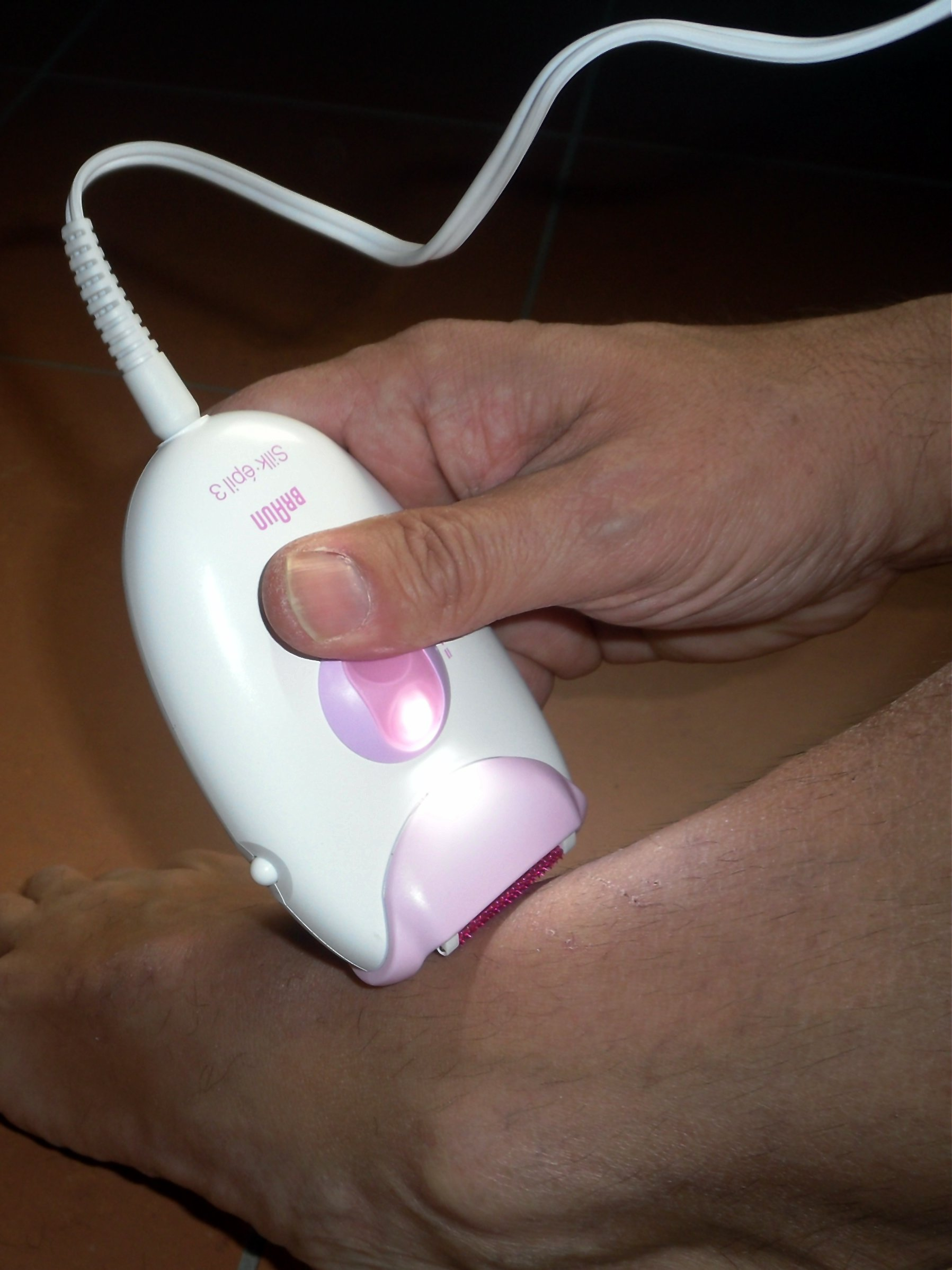
Epilator in use

The first type of epilator was the original Epilady released in Israel, and manufactured by Mepro in kibbutz HaGoshrim in 1986. The design incorporated a coil spring, which was bowed into a curve such that the coils on one side of the spring were squeezed tightly together while on the other side the coils were spread apart. The motor in the Epilady rotated the spring, causing it to flex as it rotated. Moving the rotating spring across the skin caused the hairs to be caught up in the spring and pulled out through hair follicles.

Because the springs flexed continuously, they were subject to occasional failure and were sold separately as a replacement part.

Today, there are manual epilators designed for the face that do not use a power supply. This design consists simply of a coil spring with two handles. The spring is then bowed into a curve and placed upon the unwanted facial hair whilst turning the handles. This caused the hairs to be caught between the coils of the springs and pulled out from the roots.

=== Rotating disc type ===
The Remington Lady Remington Smooth and Silky was designed to operate in a similar way to the spring type Epilady, except that a series of metal discs were used instead of a spring. It was the subject of extensive patent litigation in Europe due to a conceptual similarity to the spring type epilator. The UK patent infringement case is known as Improver Corporation v Remington Consumer Product Limited [1990] F.S.R. 181.

=== Tweezer type ===
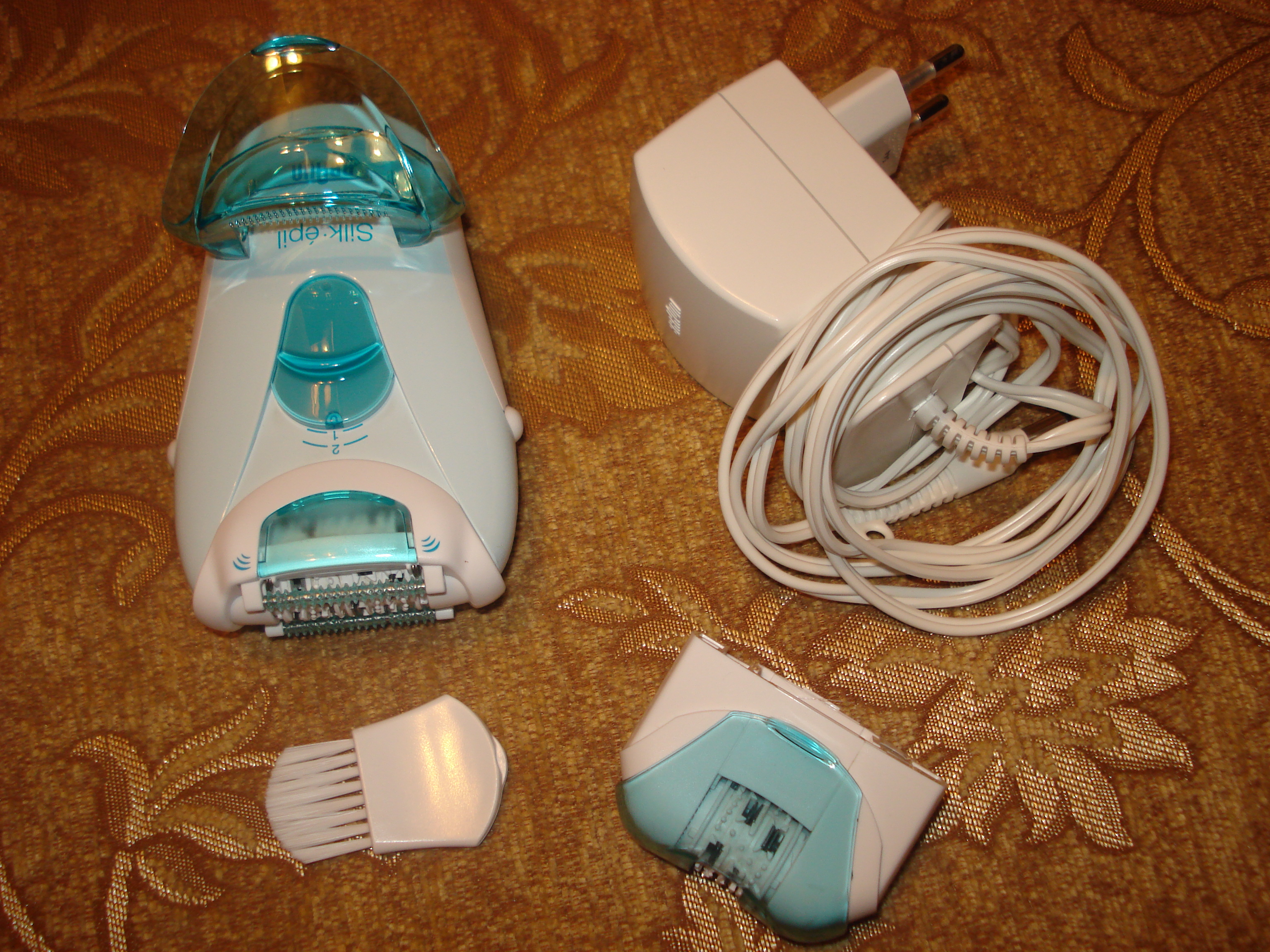
Epilator showing two different heads, cleaning brush and power adapter

The rotating disc design has been refined such that, in modern designs, the plates are no longer complete discs. The head of a modern epilator incorporates a series of metal plates mounted in a plastic housing. The ends of the plates may be exposed at one or both sides of the housing. As the head rotates, the tips of the plates move together and apart once per revolution. This creates a tweezing effect, where the hair between the plates, when they close, is pulled as the plates rotate away from the skin, then released as the plates separate. This allows a continuous cycle of gripping, pulling, extracting and discarding the hair as the epilator is moved across the skin.

Depending upon the strength and brittleness of the hair, some may snap off rather than being pulled out. Because those hairs snap off just above the skin surface, they can look somewhat like stubble from shaving, but are far more sparsely spread because the other hairs have been pulled out entirely. As with waxing, because of the phases of growth that occur with hair, there is not as much regrowth following the first epilation. Regular epilation of regrowth is less painful than the initial epilation and the number of broken off hairs diminishes with regular epilation.

=== Wet use type ===
Many modern epilators have a built in rechargeable battery and are designed to be used either wet or dry. These types of devices are built to be used in or out of the shower or with an optional cream or gel. The use of a skin cream or gel is said to be helpful with reducing the pain and irritation associated with the dry use only devices.

== Comparison with other hair removal methods ==
Method	Duration of Results	Pain Level	Cost	Pros	Cons
Epilators	3–6 weeks	Moderate to high	Moderate	Long-lasting, portable, cost-effective	Initial pain, learning curve
Trimming	Immediate (cuts hair short)	None	Low	Quick, no skin irritation, good for shaping	Does not remove hair, only trims it
Shaving	1–3 days	None	Low	Quick, usually painless, basic razors are very cheap	Frequent regrowth, risk of cuts and skin irritation (razor burn)
Depilatory creams	1–2 weeks	None	Low	Usually painless, easy to use	Skin irritation, chemical smell, cannot be used in sensitive areas, can cause chemical burns if used incorrectly
Waxing	3–6 weeks	Moderate to high	Moderate	Long-lasting, removes skin cells	Can be messy, painful, must wait for hair follicles to reach "waxable" height before waxing again
Laser hair removal	Semi-permanent	Low to moderate	Very high (clinic) Moderate (home)	Long-term results	Requires multiple sessions. In clinical settings, very expensive. Home systems are moderately expensive.
Intense pulsed light (IPL)	Semi-permanent	Low to moderate	Moderate	Long-term results	Requires multiple sessions. Devices are somewhat expensive. Some report skin sensitivity after use, and temporary pigmentation change in skin or hair.
Electrolysis	Permanent	Moderate to high	Very high	Permanent results, works on all hair colors	Painful, time-consuming, expensive, temporary scarring
