= FDA Consumer =

Government health magazine

FDA Consumer Magazine

- Categories: Healthcare
- Frequency: Bimonthly
- Publisher: U.S. Food and Drug Administration
- Founded: 1967
- First issue: January 1, 1967
- Final issue: March–April 2007
- Country: United States
- Based in: Rockville, Maryland
- Language: English
- Website: www.fda.gov

FDA Consumer was a magazine published from 1967 through 2007 by the U.S. Food and Drug Administration (FDA). From 1967 to 1972 it was known as FDA Papers before changing title to FDA Consumer with volume 6 no. 6 (July/August 1972).

The journal's stated focus was to provide "in-depth information on how to get healthy and stay healthy". Copies were distributed to depository libraries which selected to receive it. The FDA publication was available as an annual subscription for $14.00 domestic and $19.60 international. FDA Consumer ceased publication with volume 41 no. 2 (March–April 2007), though existing articles continue to be updated.

The FDA Consumer was provided online for volumes published between 1989 and 2007. The publication archive remains available through the U.S. Government Printing Office. In 2020 Casewatch.net published a complete set (1971-2007) in PDF format.

Consumer information from the FDA has migrated to the For Consumers section of its website.
