= Plucking (hair removal) =

Process of removing hair via individual removal

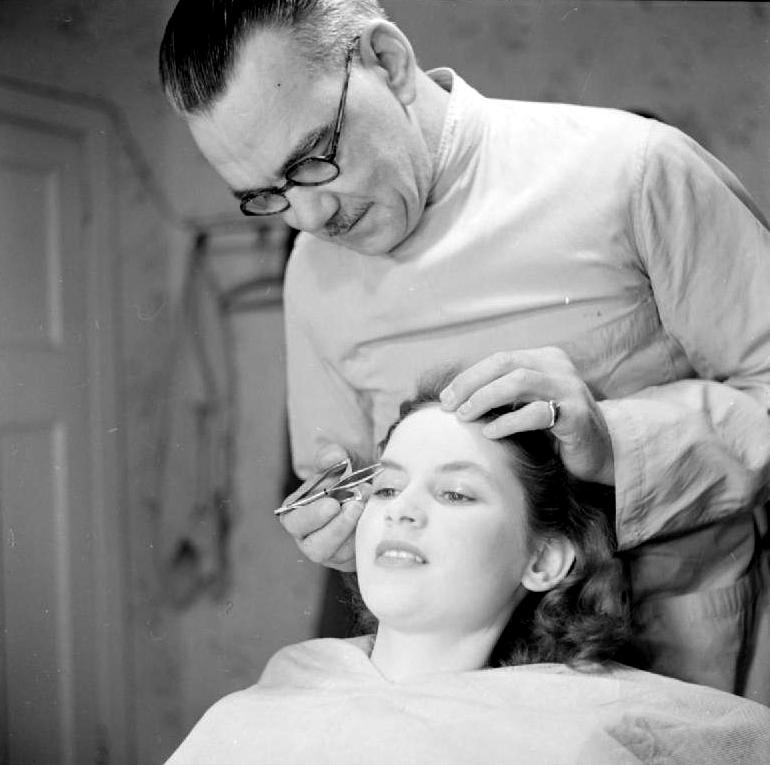
Eyebrow plucking

Plucking or tweezing can mean the process of human hair removal, removing animal hair or a bird's feathers by mechanically pulling the item from the owner's body. In humans, hair removal is done for personal grooming purposes, usually with tweezers. An epilator is a motorised hair plucker. Those under the influence of deliriants or trichotillomania may pluck their own hair out of habit.

Roman baths employed personnel solely to pluck hair from their clients' bodies.

In birds and animals, plucking is usually carried out by humans, sometimes called pluckers, to the carcass of the subject as part of food preparation.

== Disadvantages ==
While plucking is a very convenient and affordable hair removal option, it has its disadvantages. If done incorrectly, it can cause trauma to the skin. Some examples of the negative impacts of plucking includes:

- Folliculitis
- Hyperpigmentation
- Acne
- Ingrown hairs
- Infection

== Poultry ==
A capon and hen being plucked in Hainan, China

Women in Cameroon plucking slaughtered chickens

Feathers can be removed either manually or in a tumbling machine. Both methods require the feathers to be first loosened by submerging the slaughtered bird in hot water. Manual plucking involves pulling out the larger feathers then removing the down with a rubbing action. Automated plucking machines use rubber posts protruding from the inside of a spinning drum to pull the feathers from the bird. This process takes less than 30 seconds, whereas manual plucking typically takes several minutes.

== See also ==
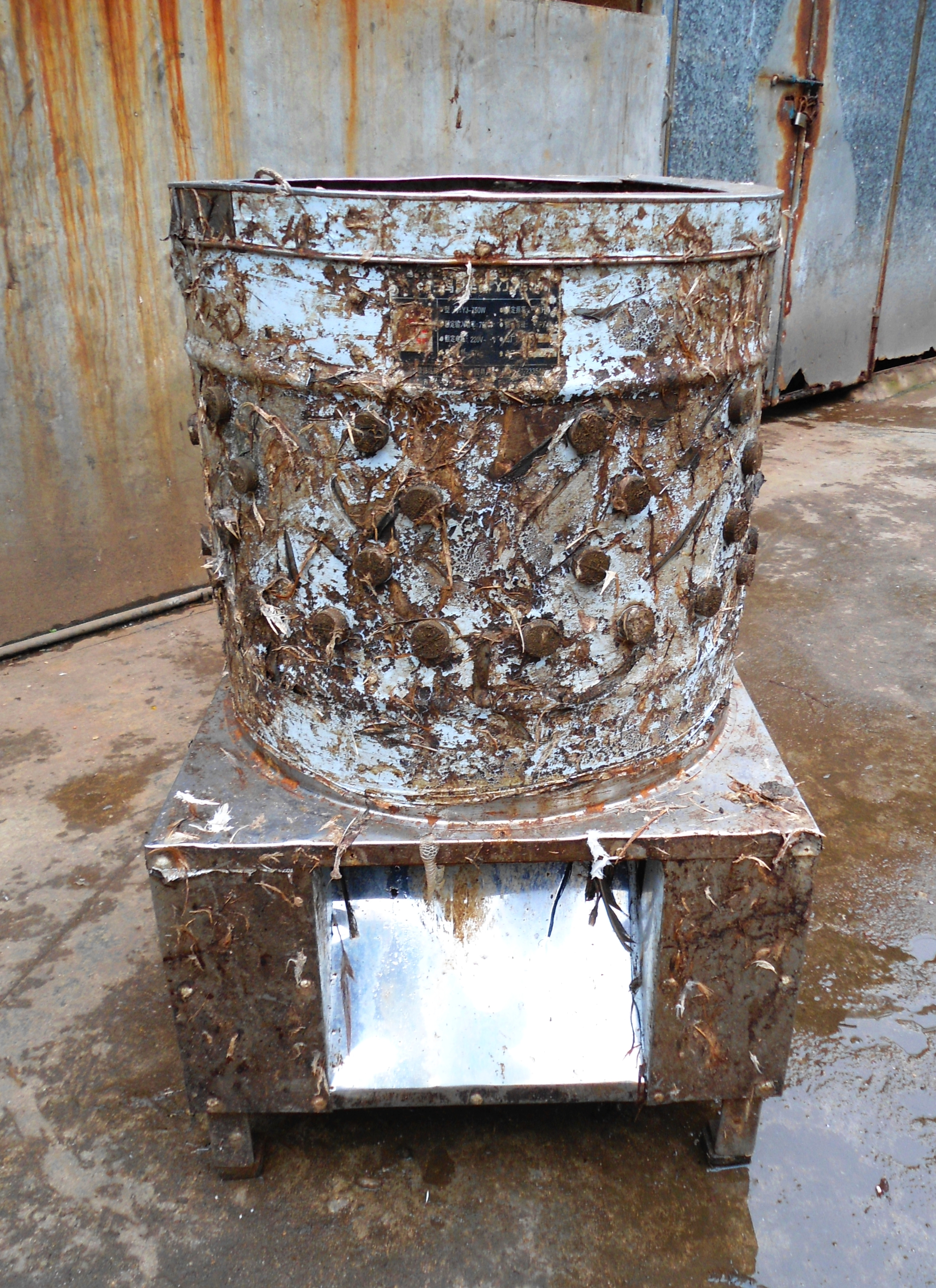
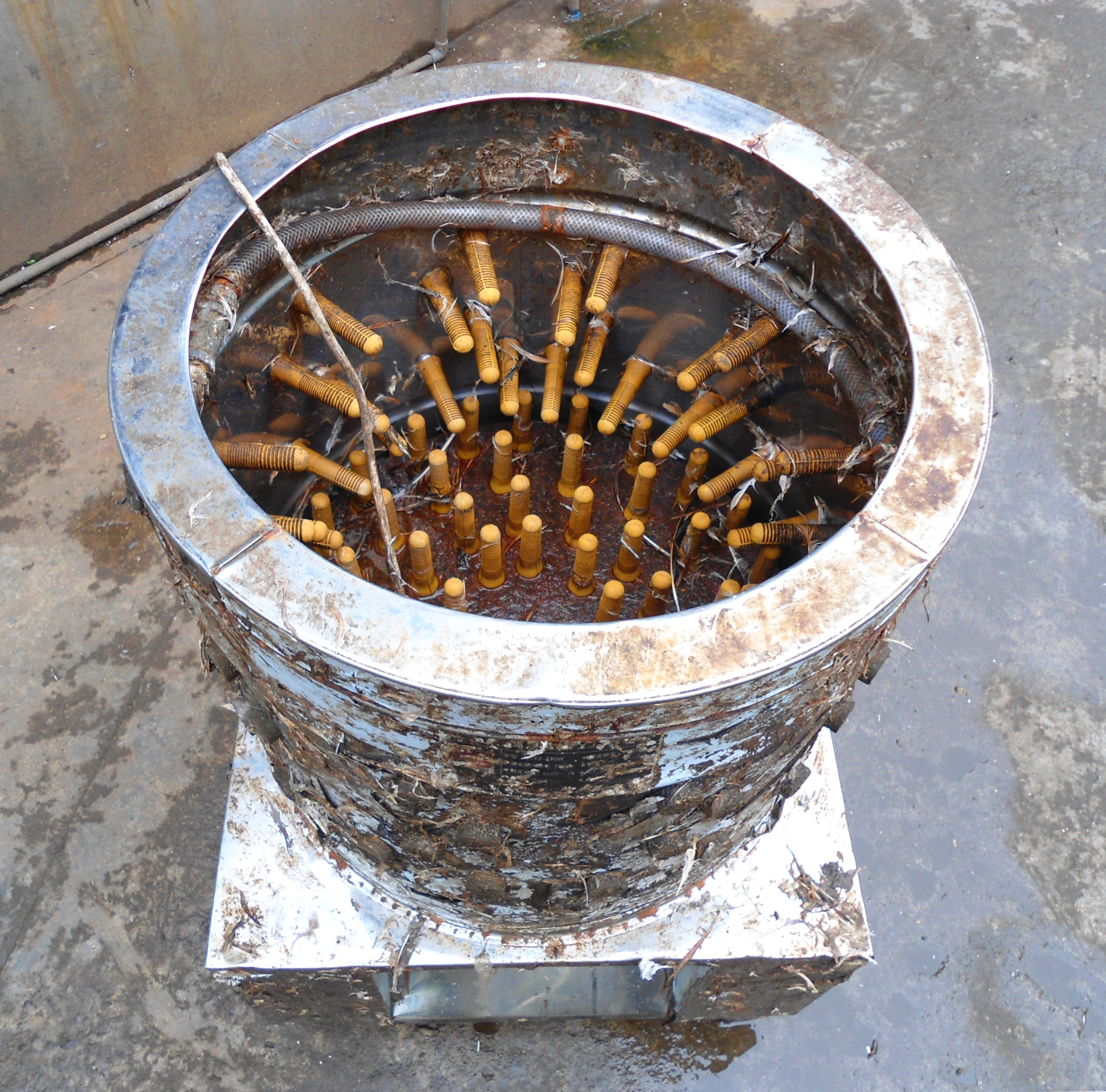
Poultry plucking machine
- Eyebrow
- Feather-plucking, a behavioural disorder in captive birds
- Unibrow
