= Sugaring (epilation) =

Method of hair removal

Sugaring, sugar waxing, or Persian waxing is a method of hair removal that has been in use since 1900 BC. Historically, sugar was confined to the regions surrounding Persia until the first millennium AD. As a result, it is speculated that honey was the first sugaring agent. Sugaring was also known as sukkar or ḥalawa in the Middle East, as ağda in Turkey, and as moum in Iran.

Sugaring is often compared to standard waxing. During the process, a sugaring substrate sticks to and essentially removes hair without attaching to the skin, making it far less painful than waxing. The substrate can be applied at room temperature or heated to a tepid temperature, minimizing the risk of burns. For this reason, sugaring is generally preferred over waxing when it comes to removing hair from larger areas of skin. If someone has sensitive skin, sugaring can nevertheless result in skin irritation and reaction. However, this can sometimes be prevented by taking an antihistamine. Sugar itself is otherwise hypoallergenic.

There are some distinct differences between home and professional-use sugar paste. The majority of store-bought products contain wax, while homemade pastes often utilize sugar and other natural ingredients.

== Sugaring paste ==
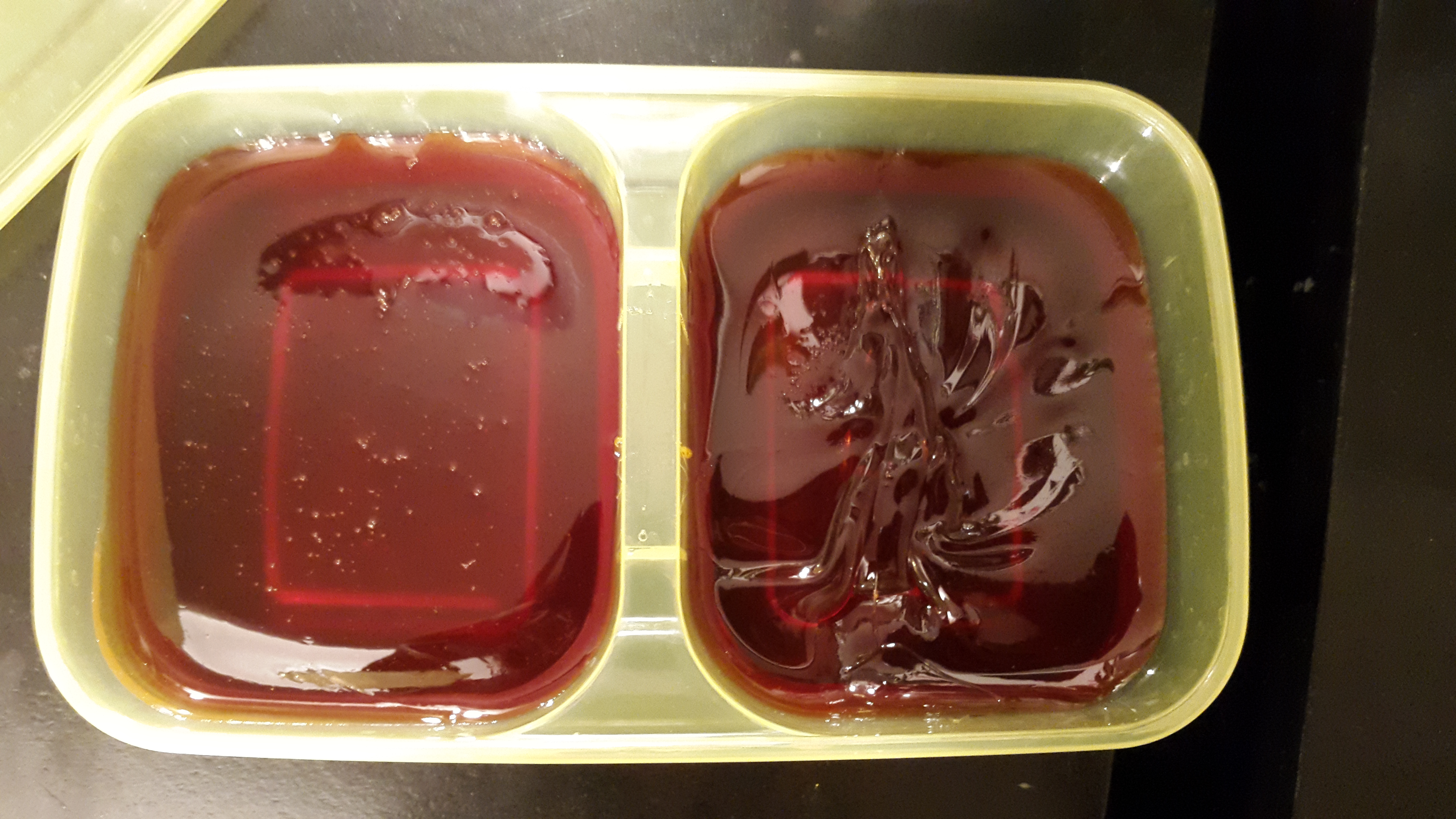
Sugaring paste

Sugaring paste can be prepared with common household food items such as water, sugar, lemon juice, cornstarch, honey and molasses. Lemon juice is added for its acidity, which breaks up the sucrose into fructose and glucose. As in candy making, this gives the finished sugaring wax a non-crystalline, or amorphous, structure. Getting the correct consistency takes practice for most users. Pre-made sugar paste is also sold. This includes professional and retail versions, which may contain guar gum for texture or essential oils to condition skin. Since sugaring paste is water-based and water-soluble, the substance can be easily cleaned up with warm water. Sugaring is sometimes preferable to waxing because it has no resins, except for guar.

== Process ==
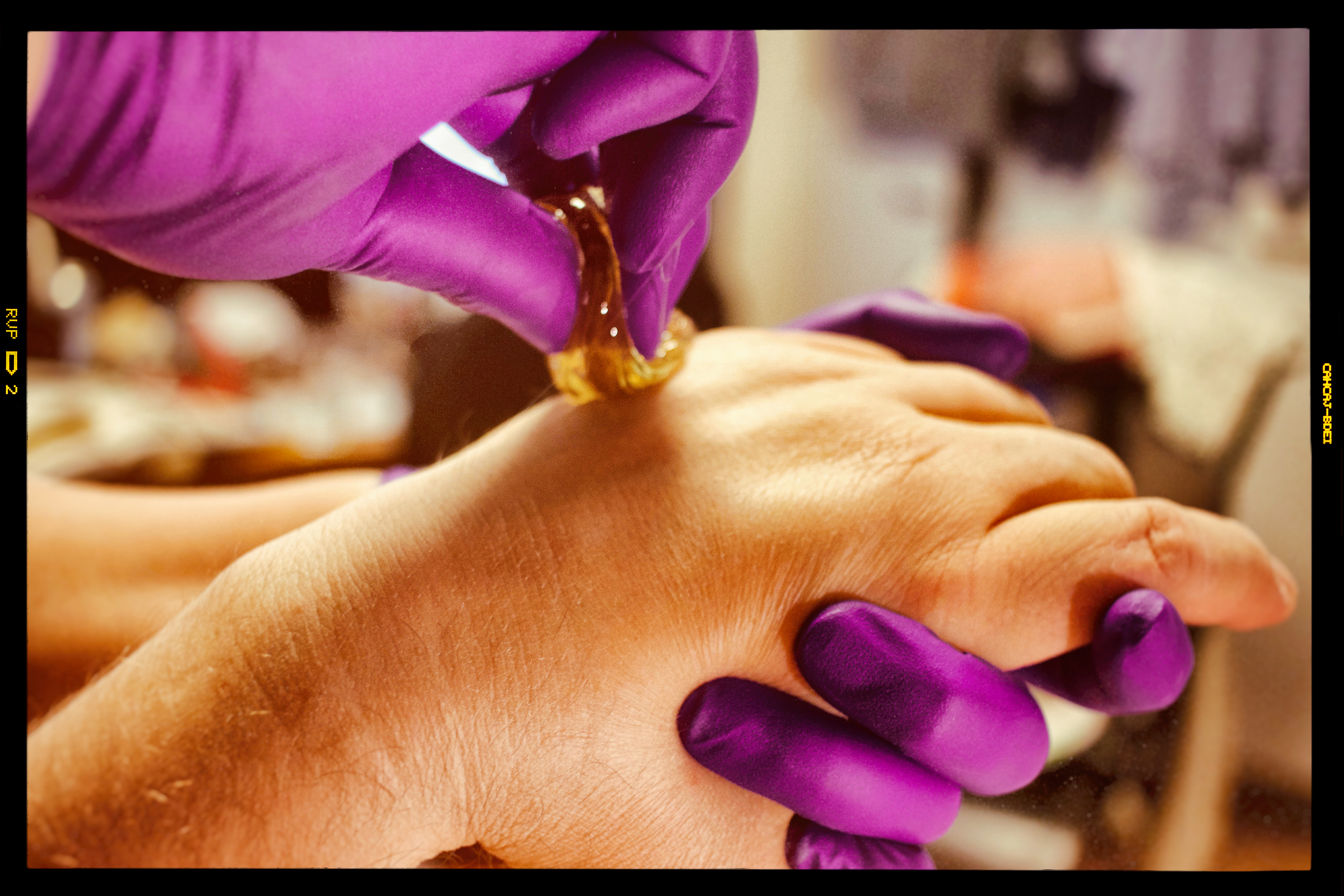
Traditional sugaring process on hand

With the strip method, known as sugar waxing, the area to be epilated is typically dusted with powder (commercial or corn starch) prior to application of the sugaring solution, which is spread on with a spatula or tongue depressor. After the sticky paste is applied to the skin in the same direction of hair growth, a strip of porous cloth or paper is pressed into the preparation and quickly removed, with the strip taking hairs along with it. In contrast to traditional waxing, any sugaring paste residue left can be washed off with water. The process can be repeated after 8–10 days of hair growth, unlike the 3–4 weeks worth of hair growth traditional waxing requires.

Traditional sugaring is done with only a ball of sugar paste and no strips are needed. This method includes applying the paste to the area against the direction of hair growth and removing the sugar paste in the direction of hair growth. This produces less pressure on the hair shaft, leading to less breakage, and resulting in smoother skin than traditional wax or sugar waxing.
