= Waxing =

Form of semi-permanent hair removal

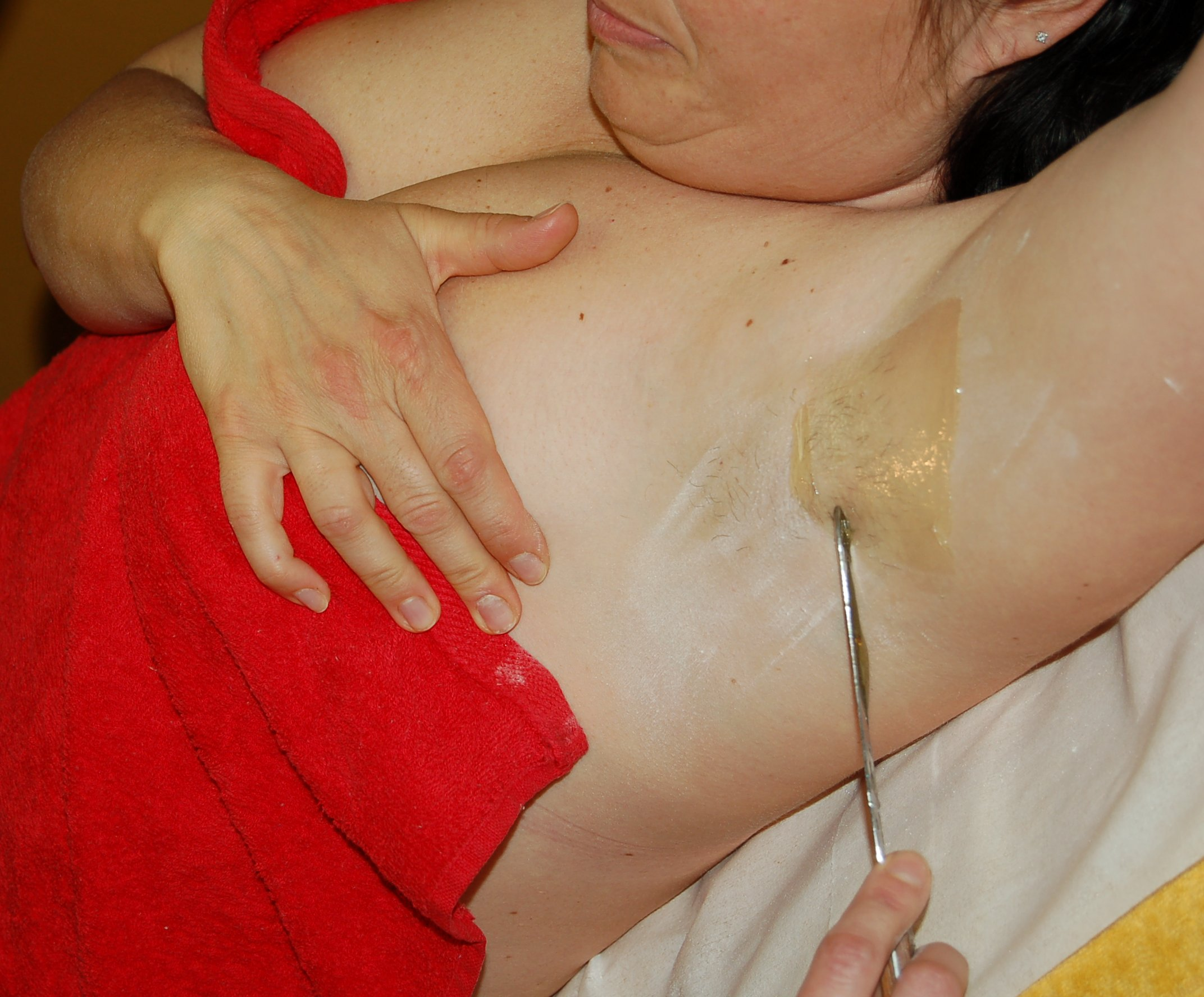
Waxing a woman's armpits.

Waxing is the process of hair removal from the root by using a covering of a sticky substance, such as wax, to adhere to body hair, and then removing this covering and pulling out the hair from the follicle. New hair will not grow back in the previously waxed area for four to six weeks, although some people will start to see regrowth in only a week due to some of their hair being on a different human hair growth cycle. Almost any area of the body can be waxed, including eyebrows, face, pubic hair (called bikini waxing or intimate waxing), legs, arms, back, abdomen, chest, knuckles, and feet. There are many types of waxing suitable for removing unwanted hair.

== Types ==
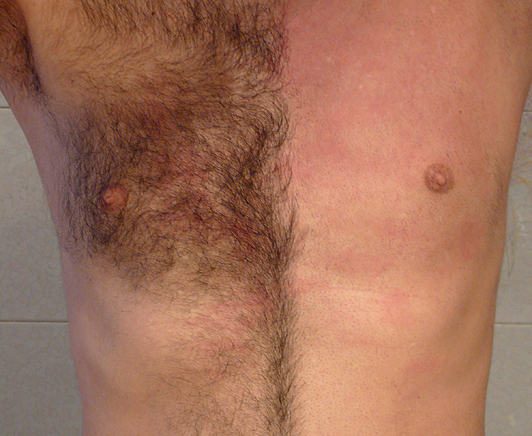
Male chest before and after waxing.

Strip waxing (soft wax) is accomplished by spreading a wax thinly over the skin. A cloth or paper strip is applied and pressed firmly, adhering the strip to the wax and the wax to the skin. The strip is then quickly ripped against the direction of hair growth, as parallel as possible to the skin to avoid trauma to the skin. This removes the wax along with the hair. There are different forms of strip waxing or soft waxing: heated, cold or pre-made strips. Unlike cold waxing, heated wax is spread easily over the skin. Cold waxing is thicker, which makes it more difficult to spread smoothly over the skin. Pre-made strips come with the wax on them, and they come in different sizes for different area uses.

Stripless wax (as opposed to strip wax) comprises both hard wax and film wax. Hard wax is applied somewhat thickly and with no cloth or paper strips. Film wax similarly so but is spread in a thin film. The wax then hardens when it cools, thus allowing the easy removal by a therapist without the aid of clothes or strips. This waxing method is very beneficial to people who have sensitive skin. Stripless wax does not adhere to the skin as much as strip wax does, thus making it a good option for sensitive skin, as finer hairs are more easily removed because the hard wax encapsulates the hair as it hardens. The stripless waxing method can also be less painful.

== Contraindications ==
The following factors are known to make those who are waxed more prone to "skin lifting", where the top layer of skin is torn away during waxing treatment:

- Taking blood-thinning medications;
- Taking drugs for autoimmune diseases, including lupus;
- Taking prednisone or steroids;
- Psoriasis, eczema, or other chronic skin diseases;
- Recent sunburn;
- Recent cosmetic or reconstructive surgery;
- Recent laser skin treatment;
- Severe varicose leg veins;
- Rosacea or very sensitive skin;
- History of fever blisters or cold sores (waxing can cause a flare-up);
- Using Tretinoin, Tazarotene, Adapalene, or any other topical retinoid;
- Recent surgical peel, microdermabrasion, or chemical peel using glycolic, alpha hydroxy, salicylic acid, or other acid-based products.

There are many benefits to waxing versus other forms of hair removal. It is an effective method to remove large amounts of hair at one time. It is a long-lasting method, as hair in waxed areas will not grow back for two to eight weeks. When hair is shaved or removed by depilatory cream, the hair is removed at the surface rather than the hair root. Within a few days, the hair can reappear back at the surface. With these methods, hair tends to grow back in a rough stubble. Areas that are repeatedly waxed over long periods of time often exhibit regrowth that is softer.

There are many drawbacks of waxing as well. Waxing can be painful when the strip is removed from the skin. Although the pain is not long-lasting, it can be intense, particularly in sensitive areas. Another drawback to waxing is the expense: waxing is usually performed by a licensed esthetician and in some cases the cost can be high, depending on the area waxed and the number of sittings required. There are do-it-yourself waxing supplies, but they may be difficult to use on oneself on some areas on the body.

Another drawback of waxing is that some people experience ingrown hairs, red bumps, and minor bleeding. This is more likely to occur when waxing areas with thick hair, especially the first few times when follicles are strongest.

== See also ==
- Bikini waxing
- Body treatment
- Electrolysis
- Male waxing
- Persian waxing
