= Leg shaving =

Cultural grooming practice

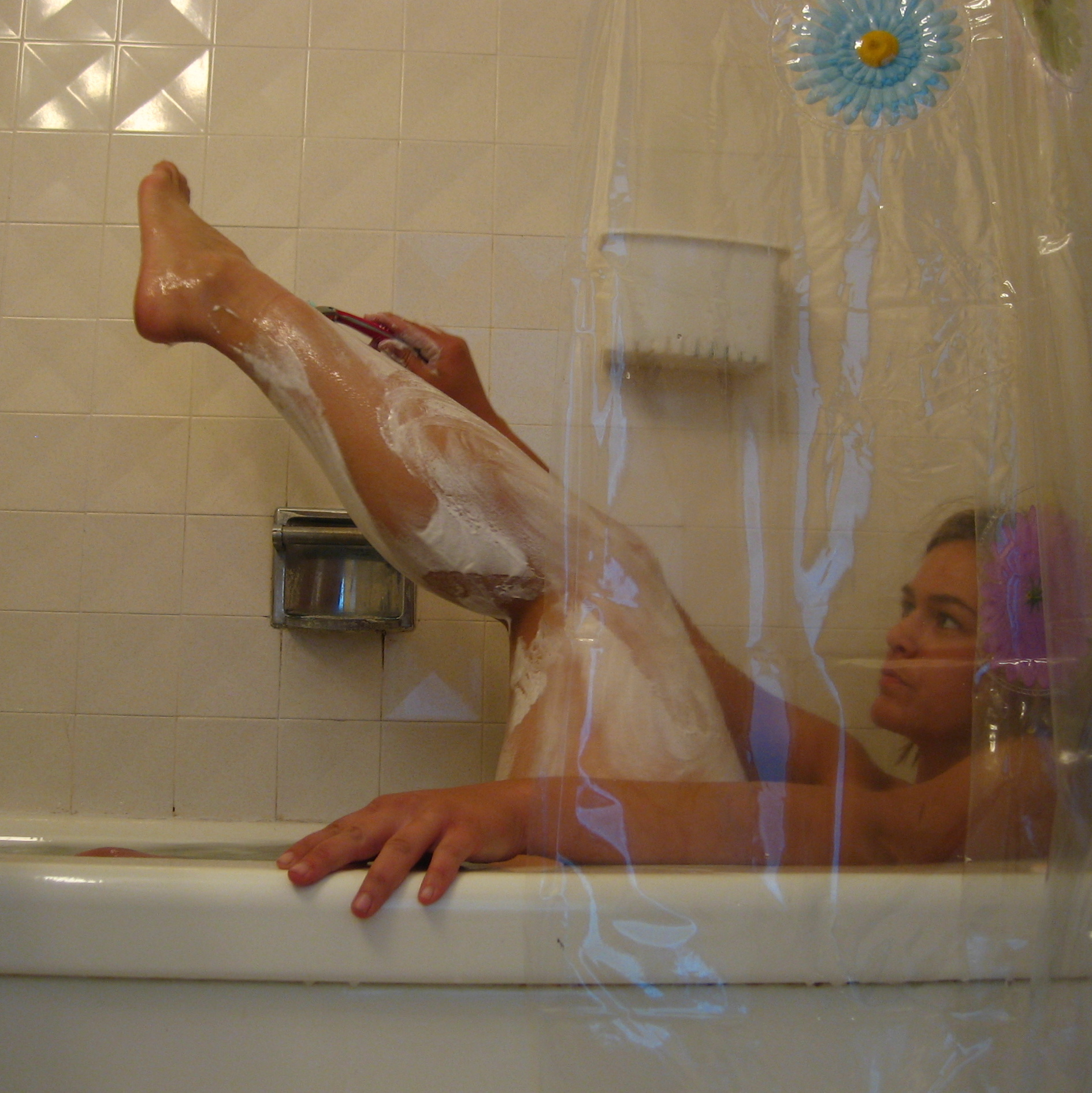
Woman shaving her legs

Leg shaving is the practice of removing leg hair by shaving the hair off using a razor or electric shaver. In addition, some people remove leg hair using waxing, sugaring, depilatories, epilators or other depilation devices, or lasers, but shaving remains the least expensive and one of the least painful methods.

It is a very common practice among women in the western world, and is also done by men, especially bodybuilders, cyclists, swimmers, and runners.

== By gender ==
=== Women ===
In Western countries, many women engage in leg shaving, doing so largely for aesthetic reasons. This practice has developed especially since the early 20th century, around the time of the First World War, as hemlines on women's dresses have become shorter and women's swimsuits have become more revealing, displaying all of a woman's legs.

Some women may only shave the hair below the knee – depending on the length of dress styles in fashion – while others shave the entire leg. The frequency of shaving also varies, with some women shaving their legs every day, and others shaving only at the start of summer, in anticipation of the wearing of a swimsuit. Special razors, different in shape from those used by men for face-shaving, are often used by women.

=== Men ===
Among Western men, the shaving of legs is common in sporting situations and in fact has been taking place for longer than women shaving their legs. Male leg hair removal in modern times was initially related to sports, though it is now more frequently done for aesthetics.

For sports such as cycling and swimming, men started shaving their legs around the turn of the 20th century. Most male swimmers, bicycle racers, and some male non-racers shave their legs regularly. The practice is most useful in long-distance swimming, where the effects of drag can cause a significant time difference in races over 400 meters. Other reasons cyclists shave include: faster healing and easier cleaning of road rash, less pain during leg massage.

Seneca suggested that in ancient Rome it was considered an ostentatious bit of effeminacy, contrary to underarm hair removal: "One is, I believe, as faulty as the other: the one class are unreasonably elaborate, the other are unreasonably negligent; the former depilate the leg, the latter not even the armpit" (letter 114). Summers cites Ovid, A. A. i. 506 "Don't rub your legs smooth with the tight-scraping pumice stone."

Many athletes also shave their legs or bodies to facilitate therapeutic massage that is frequently a part of their training or post-race recovery programs. They may also shave their legs if they tape protective gear to them to prevent the tape from pulling painfully on the hair when removed. Shaving of the legs is also frequently practiced by male models and bodybuilders, since it accentuates muscle definition.

== See also ==
- Hair removal
- Hirsutism
- Underarm hair
- Waxing
