= Electric shaver =

Razor with an electrically powered rotating or oscillating blade

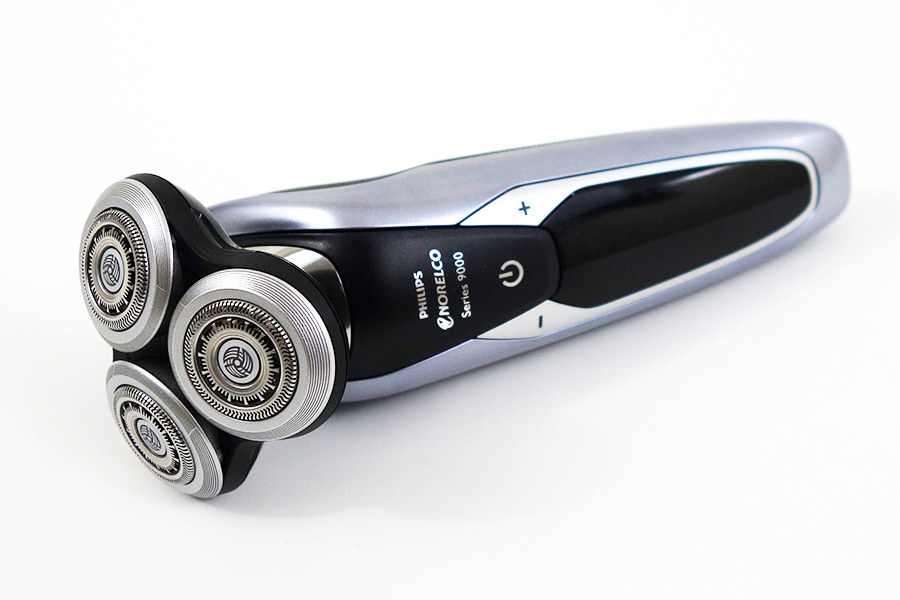
- Rotary-style electric shaver

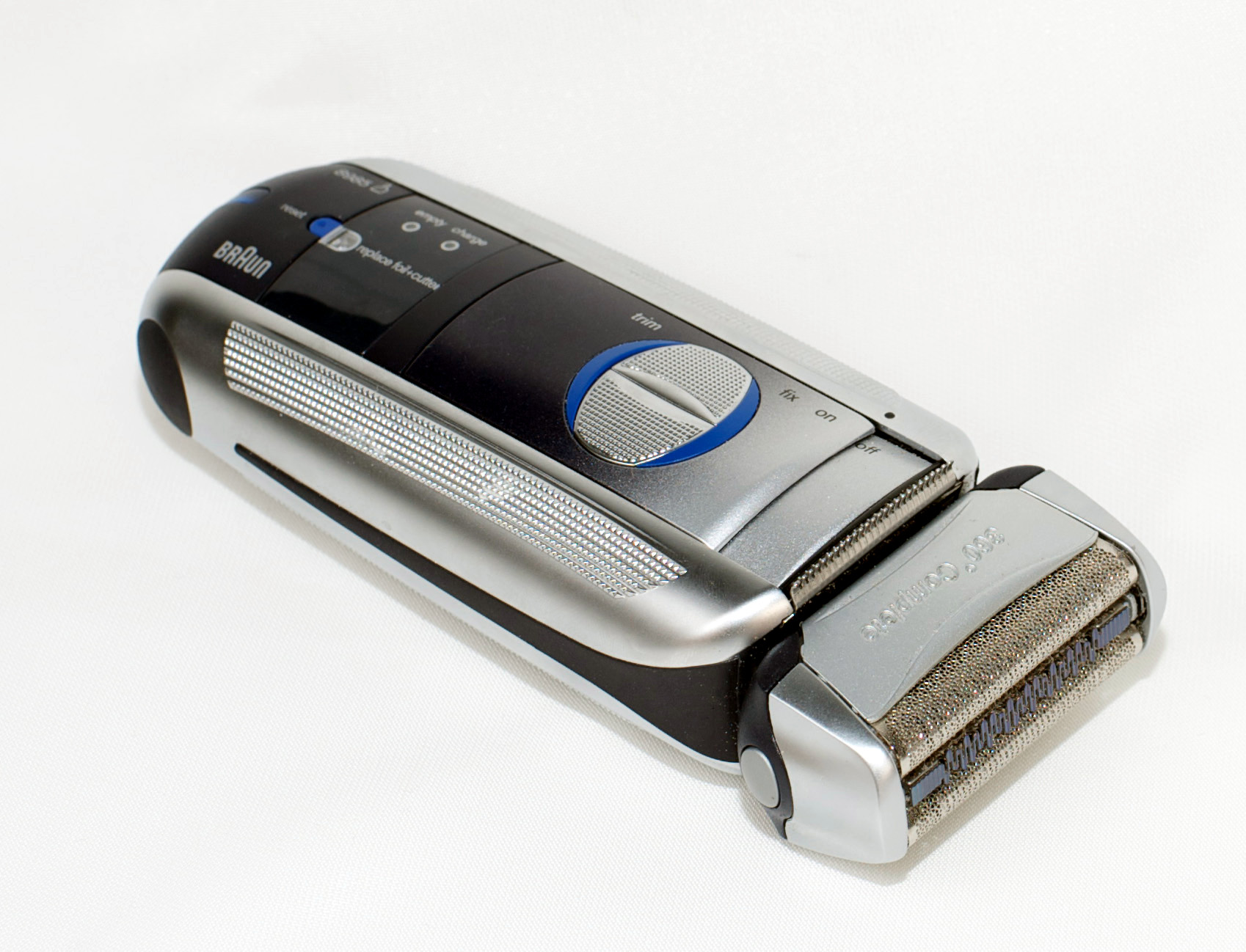
- Foil-type electric razor
- Other names: Dry razor, electric razor, shaver
- Classification: Personal grooming device
- Types: Rotary, foil, corded, battery-powered
- Related: Electric hair clippers, safety razor

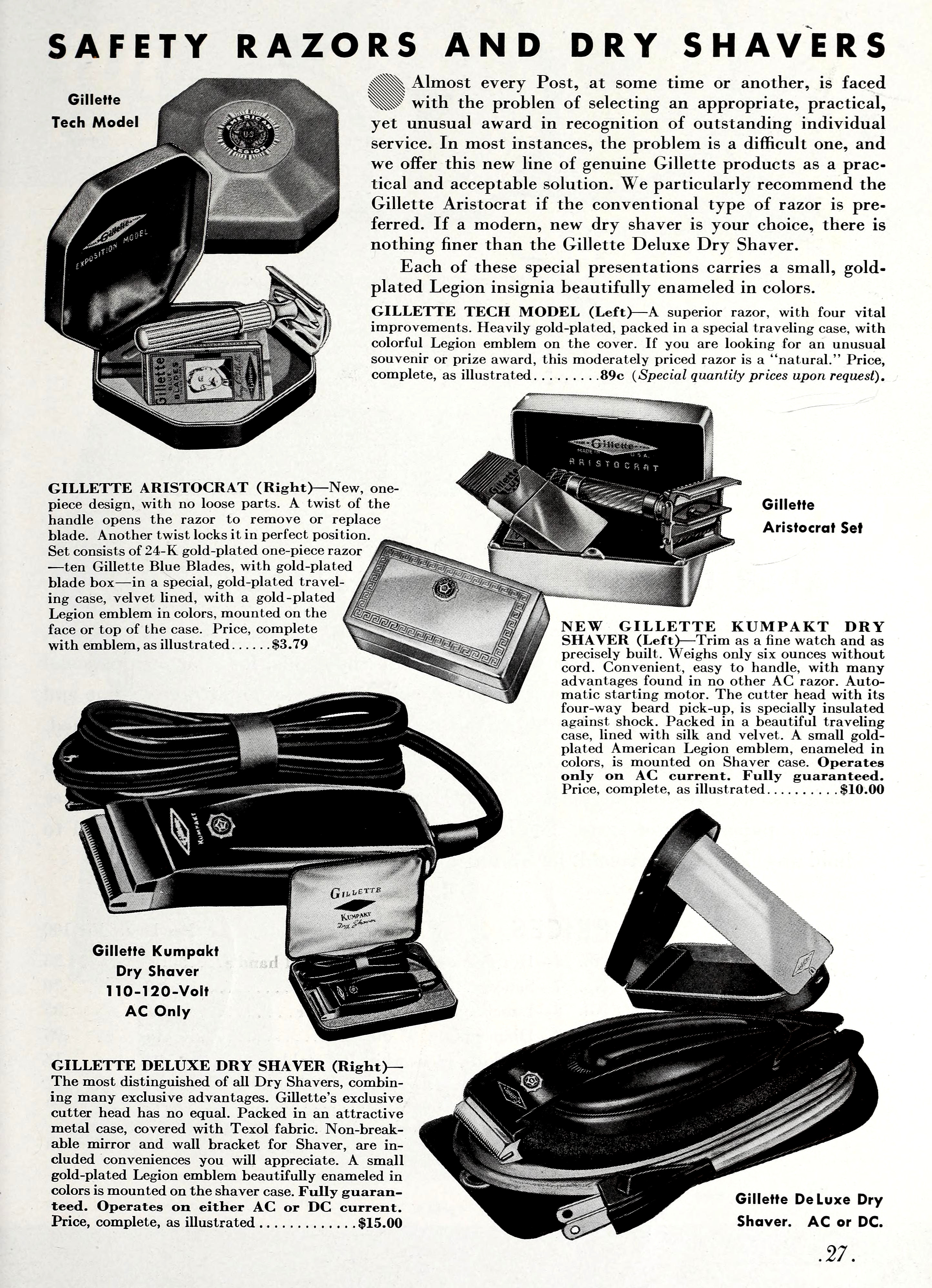
Gillette Tech, Aristocrat, Kumpakt, and DeLuxe dry shaver advert (1940)

An electric shaver (also known as the dry razor, electric razor, or simply shaver) is a razor with an electrically powered rotating or oscillating blade. The electric shaver usually does not require the use of shaving cream, soap, or water, known as dry shaving, although many users still prefer a skin lubricant for comfort.

The razor may be powered by a small DC motor, which is either powered by batteries or mains electricity. Many modern ones are powered using rechargeable batteries. Alternatively, an electro-mechanical oscillator driven by an AC-energized solenoid may be used. Some very early mechanical shavers had no electric motor and had to be powered by hand, for example by pulling a cord to drive a flywheel.

Electric shavers fall into two main categories: foil shavers or rotary shavers. Users tend to prefer one or the other. Foil shavers can shave closer to the skin and are preferred by professional barbers, while rotary shavers use rotating blades on the shaving head to shave.

Many modern at-home shavers are cordless; they are charged with a plug charger or they are placed within a cleaning and charging dock.

== History ==
The first person to receive a patent for a razor powered by electricity was John Francis O'Rourke, a New York civil engineer, with his US patent 616554 filed in 1898. The first working electric razor was invented in 1915 by German engineer Johann Bruecker. Others followed suit, such as the American Col. Jacob Schick, considered to be the father of the modern electric razor, who patented the first electric razor in 1930. The Remington Rand Corporation developed the electric razor further, first producing the electric razor in 1937. Another important inventor was Prof. Alexandre Horowitz, from Philips Laboratories in the Netherlands, who designed one of the first rotary razors. It has a shaving head consisting of cutters that cut off the hair entering the head of the razor at skin level. Roland Ullmann from Braun in Germany was another inventor who was decisive for development of the modern electric razor. He was the first to fuse rubber and metal elements on shavers and developed more than 100 electrical razors for Braun. In the course of his career Ullmann filed well over 100 patents for innovations in the context of dry shavers. The major manufacturers introduce new improvements to the hair-cutting mechanism of their products every few years. Each manufacturer sells several different generations of cutting mechanism at the same time, and for each generation, several models with different features and accessories to reach various price points. The improvements to the cutting mechanisms tend to 'trickle-down' to lower-priced models over time.

Early versions of electric razors were meant to be used on dry skin only. Many recent electric razors have been designed to allow for wet/dry use, which also allows them to be cleaned using running water or an included cleaning machine, reducing cleaning effort. Some patience is necessary when starting to use a razor of this type, as the skin usually takes some time to adjust to the way that the electric razor lifts and cuts the hairs. Moisturizers designed specifically for electric shaving are available.

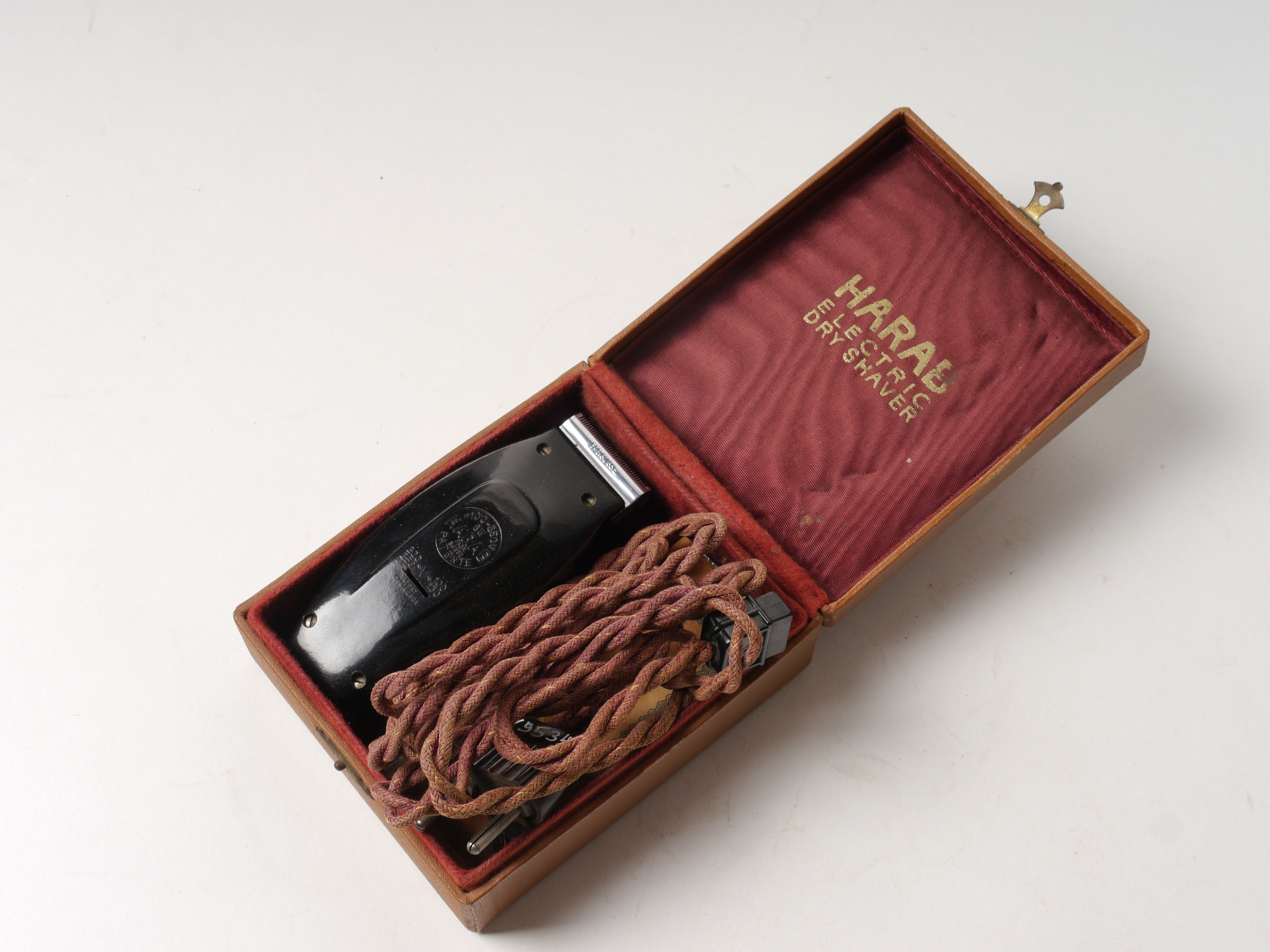
Harab electric shaver (1940s)

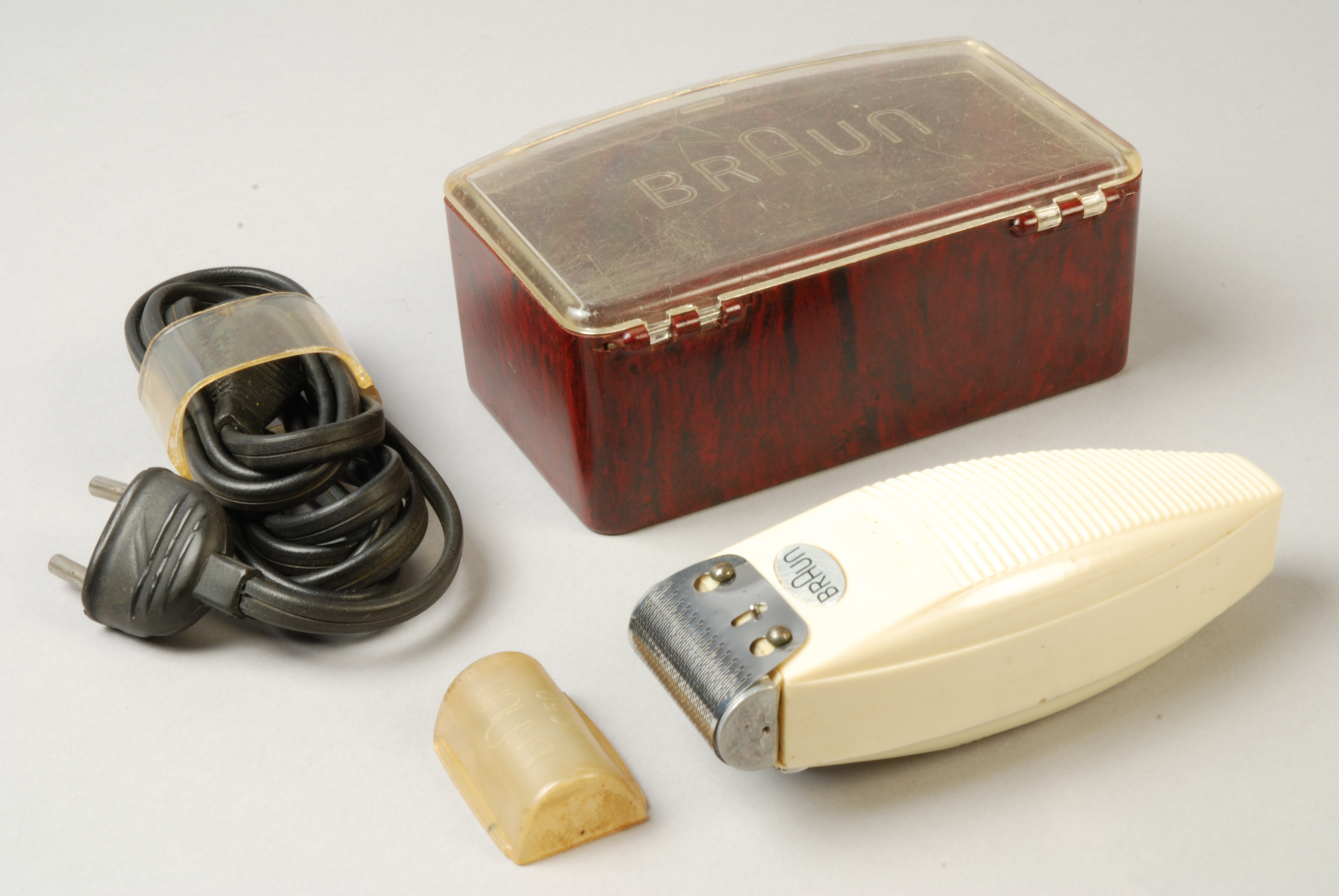
Braun model S 50 electric shaver (1950)

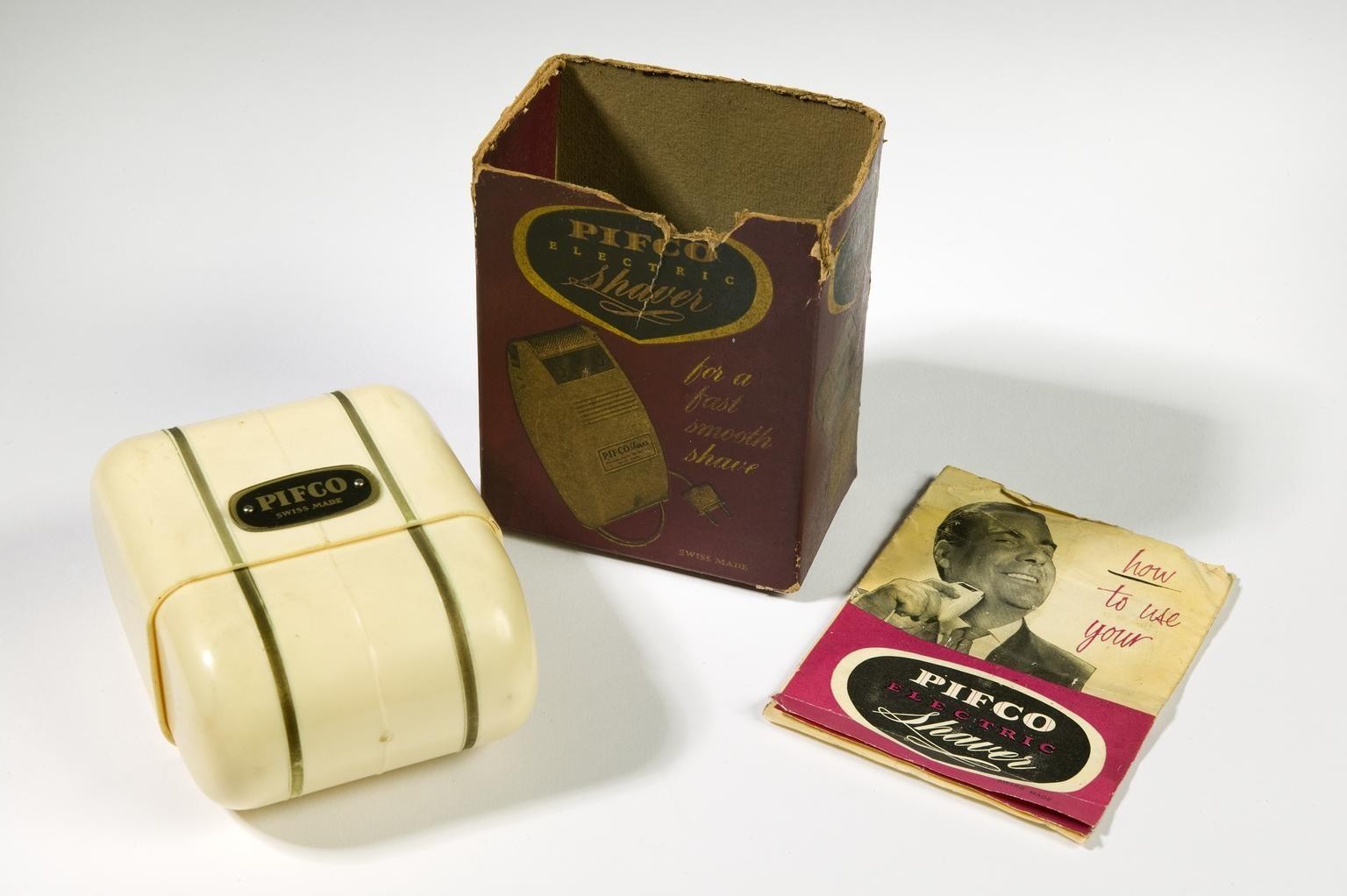
Pifco electric shaver (1950s)

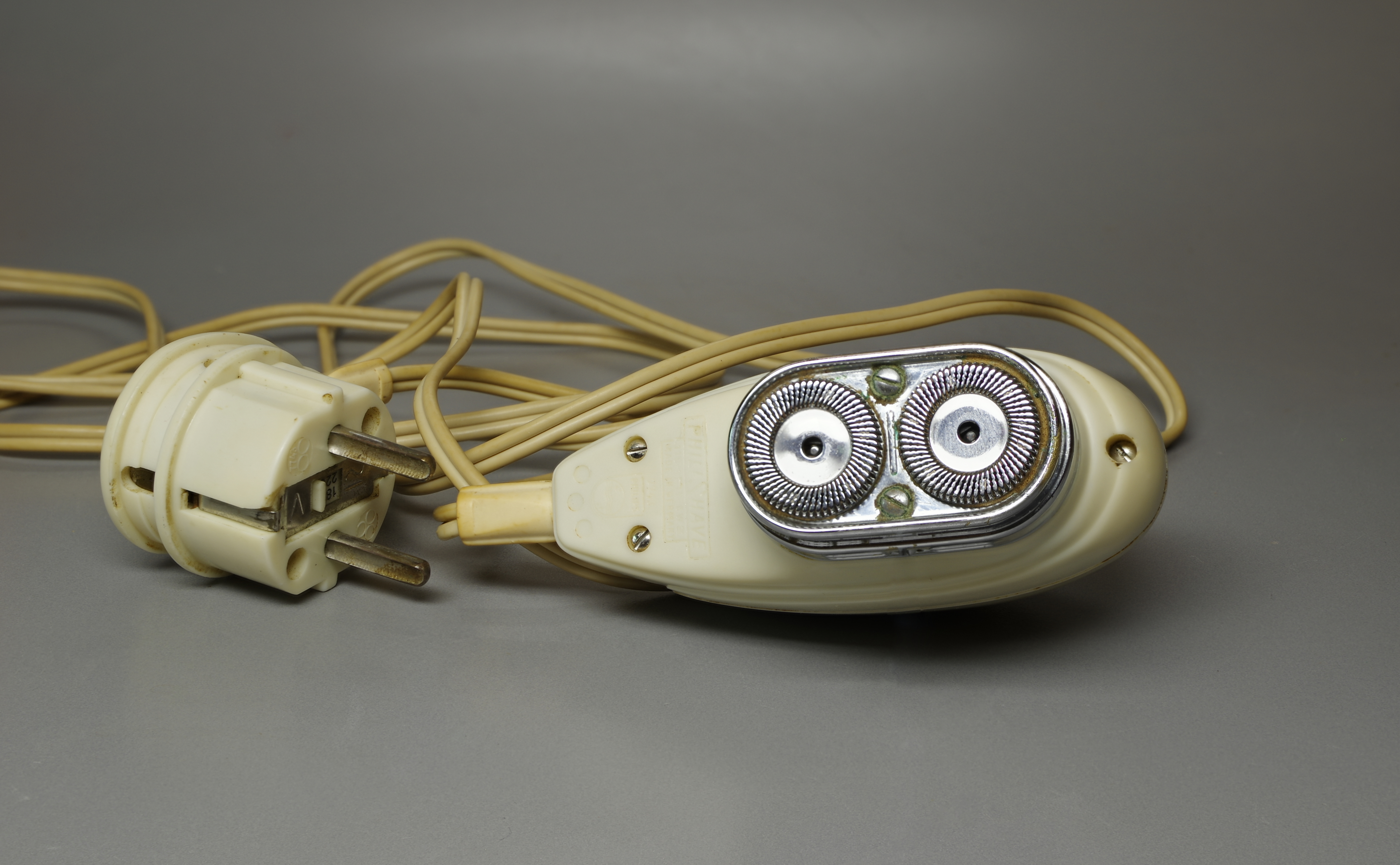
Philips electric shaver (1950s or 1960s)

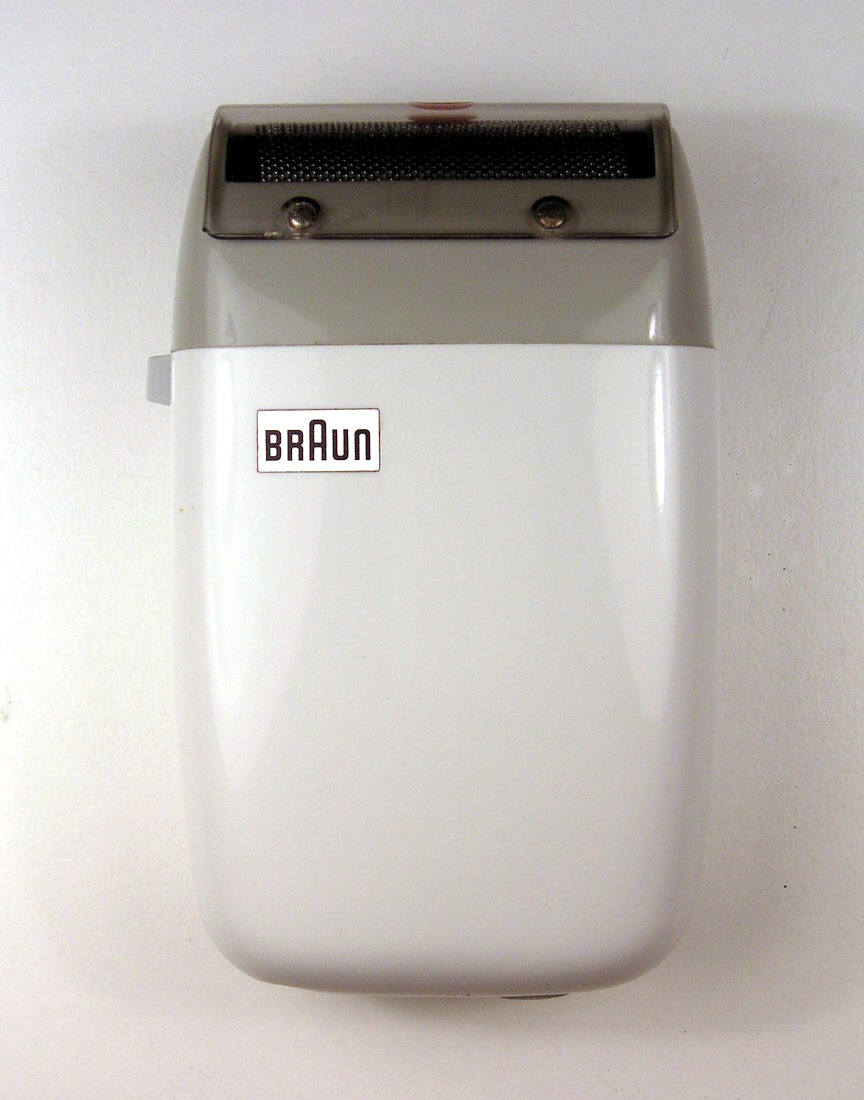
Braun model Sixtant SM 2 (1963)
Braun model 5410 (late 1970s)
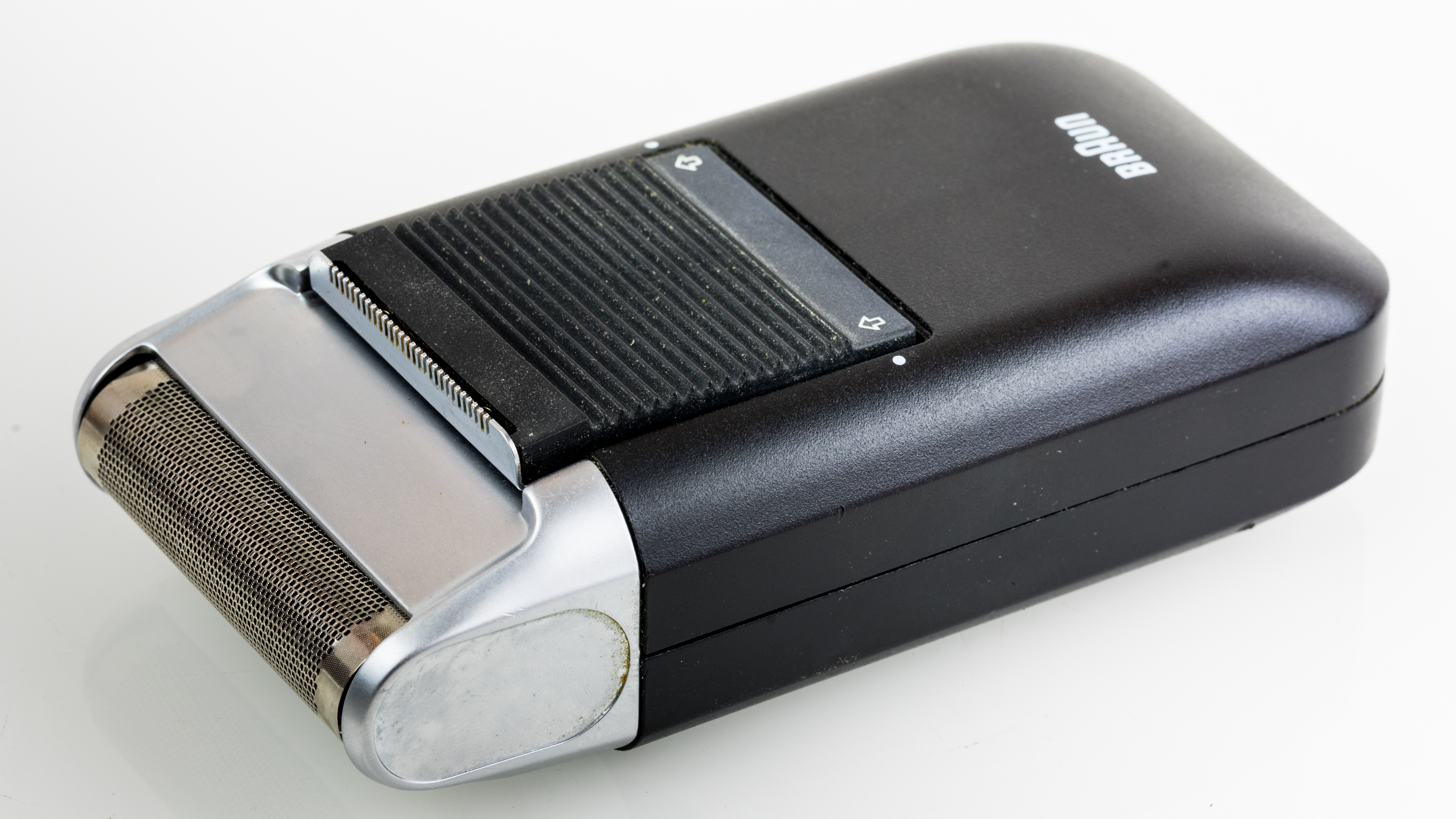

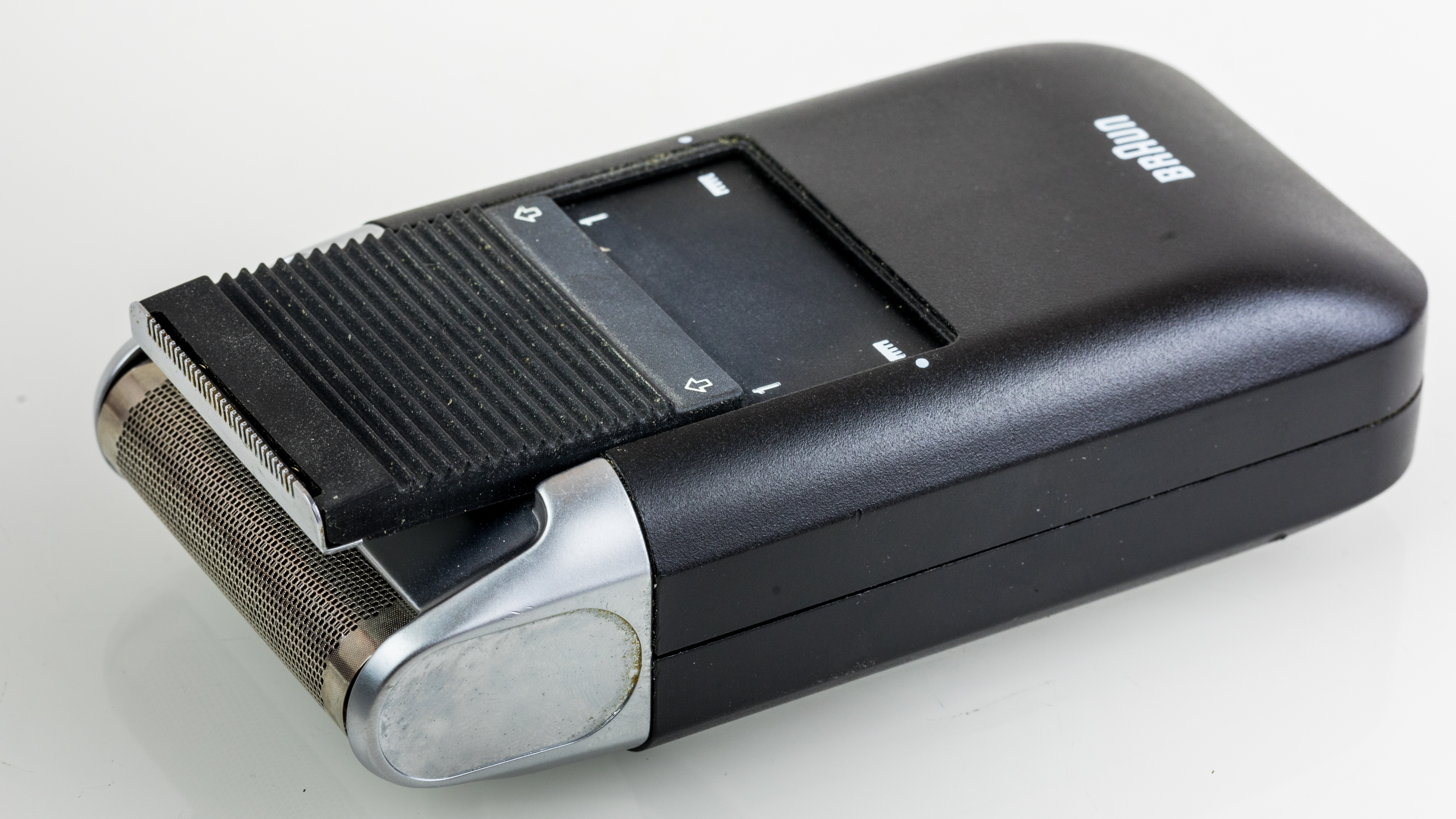

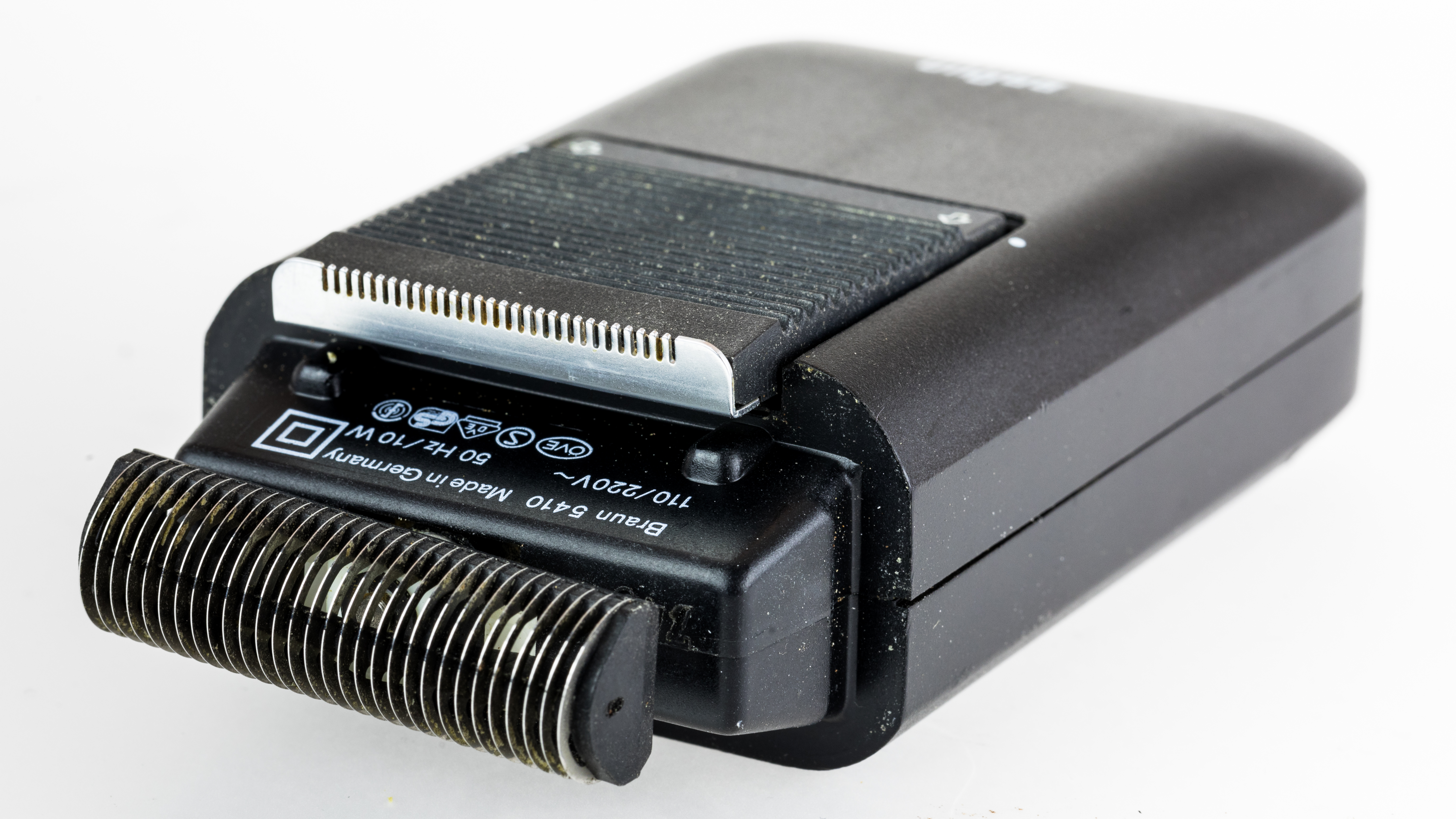

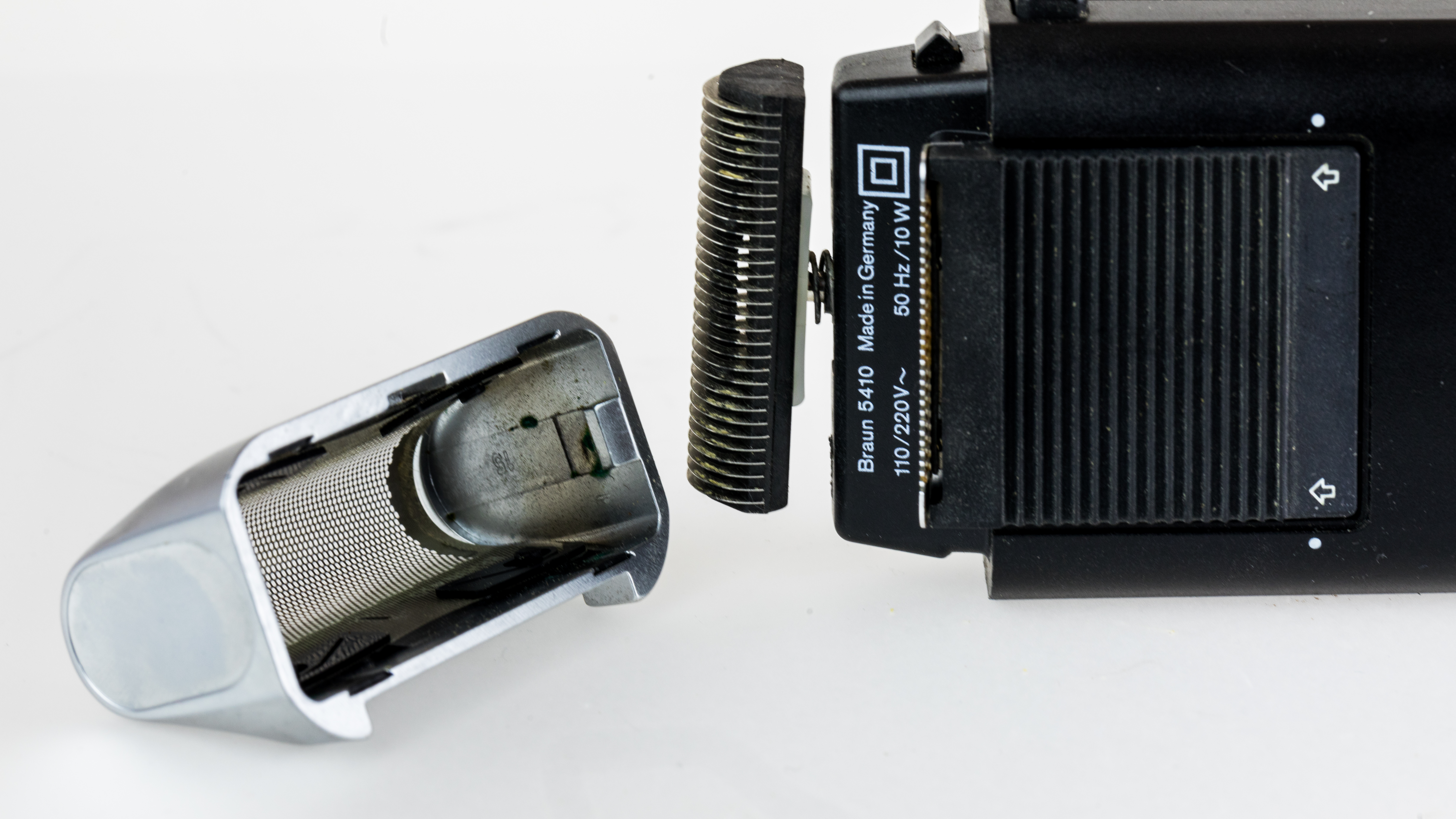

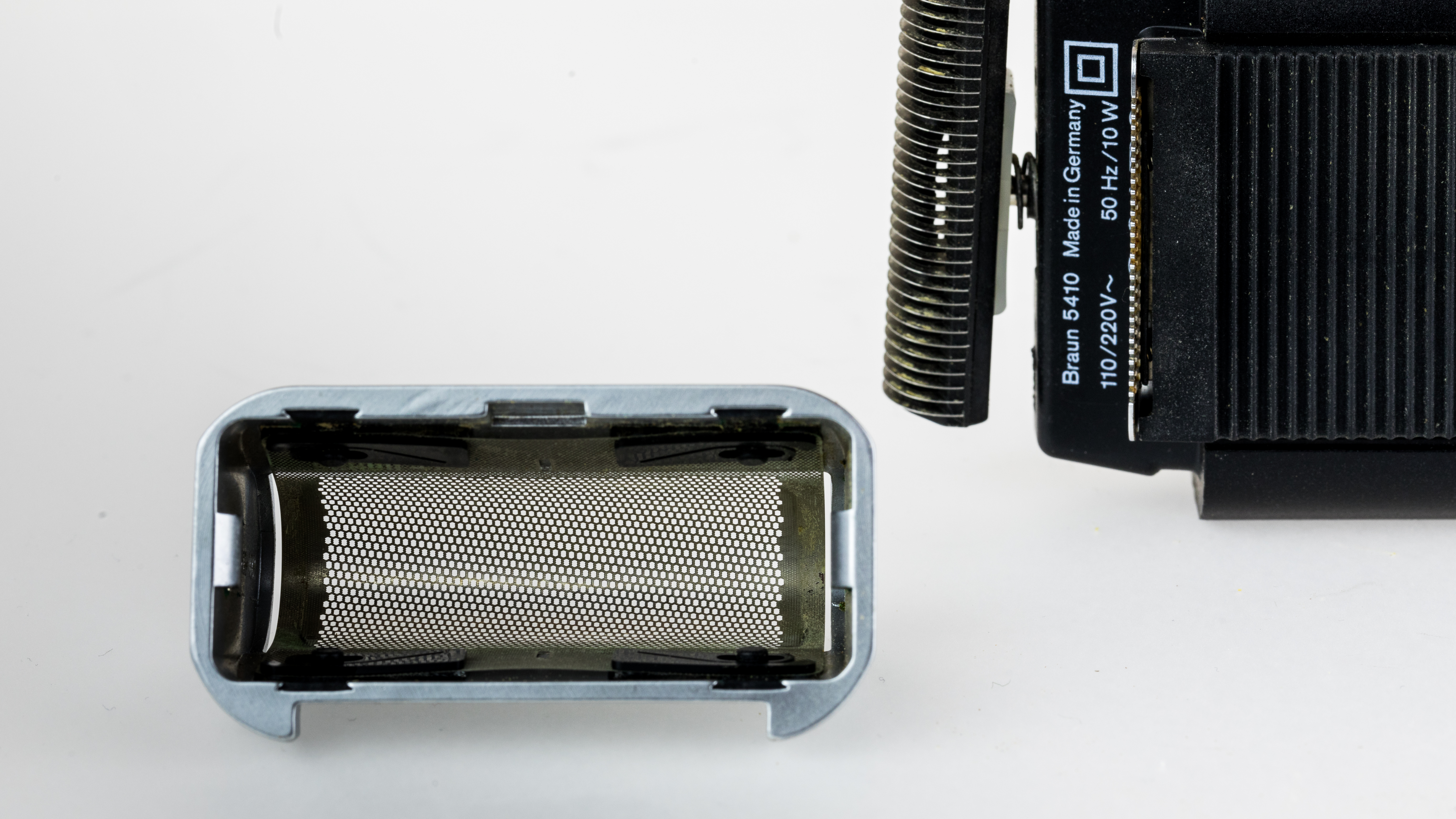

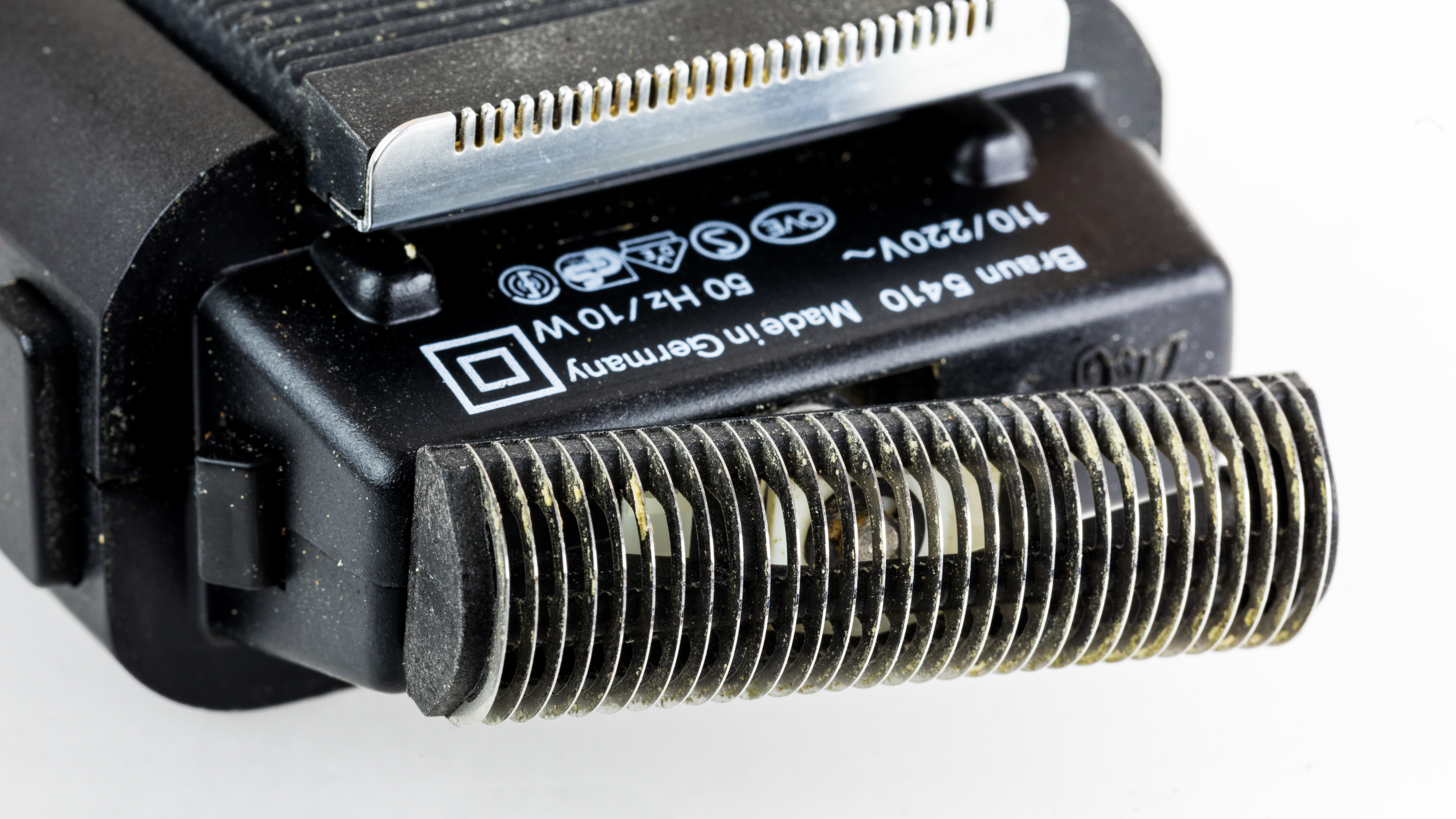

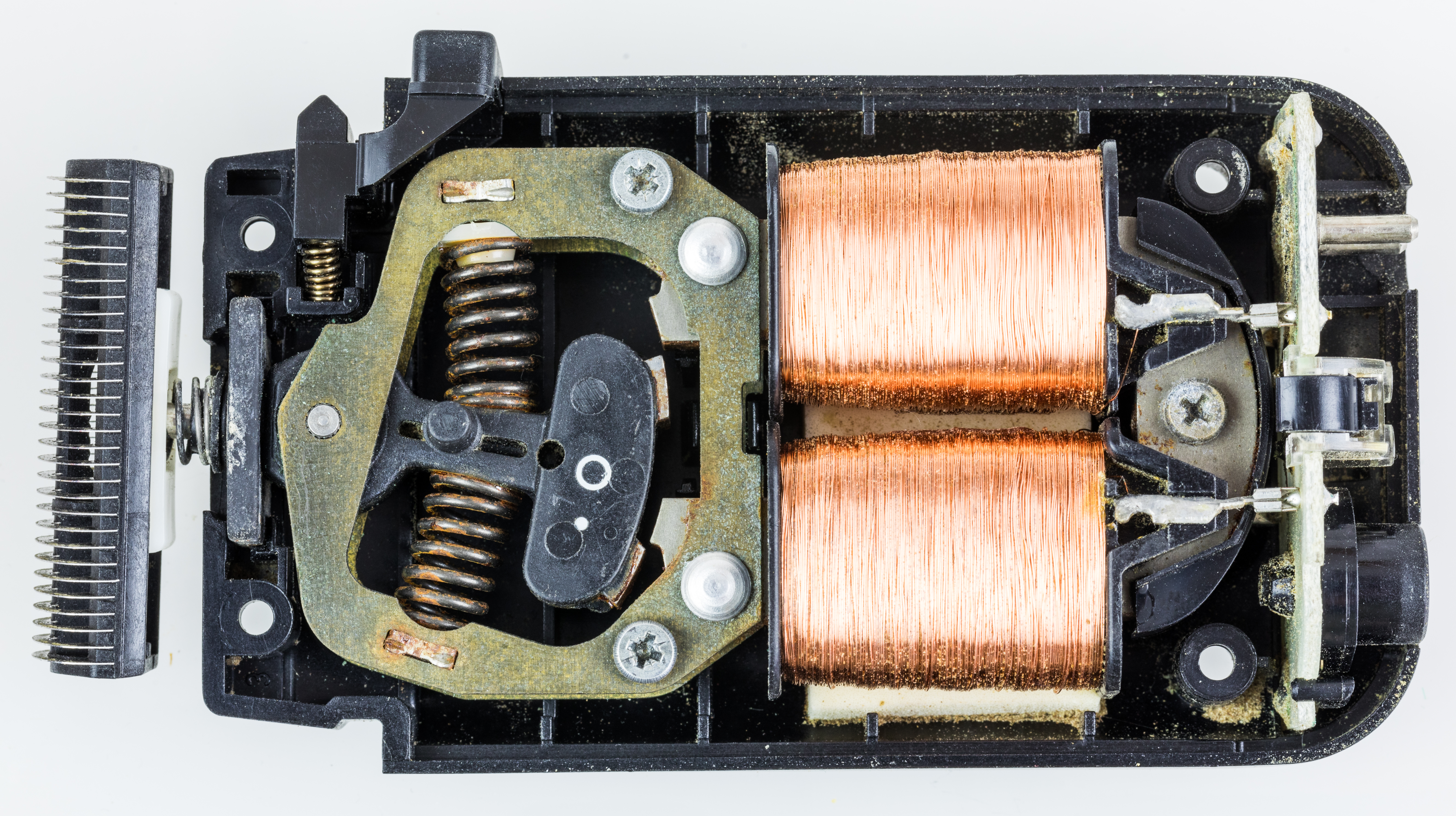

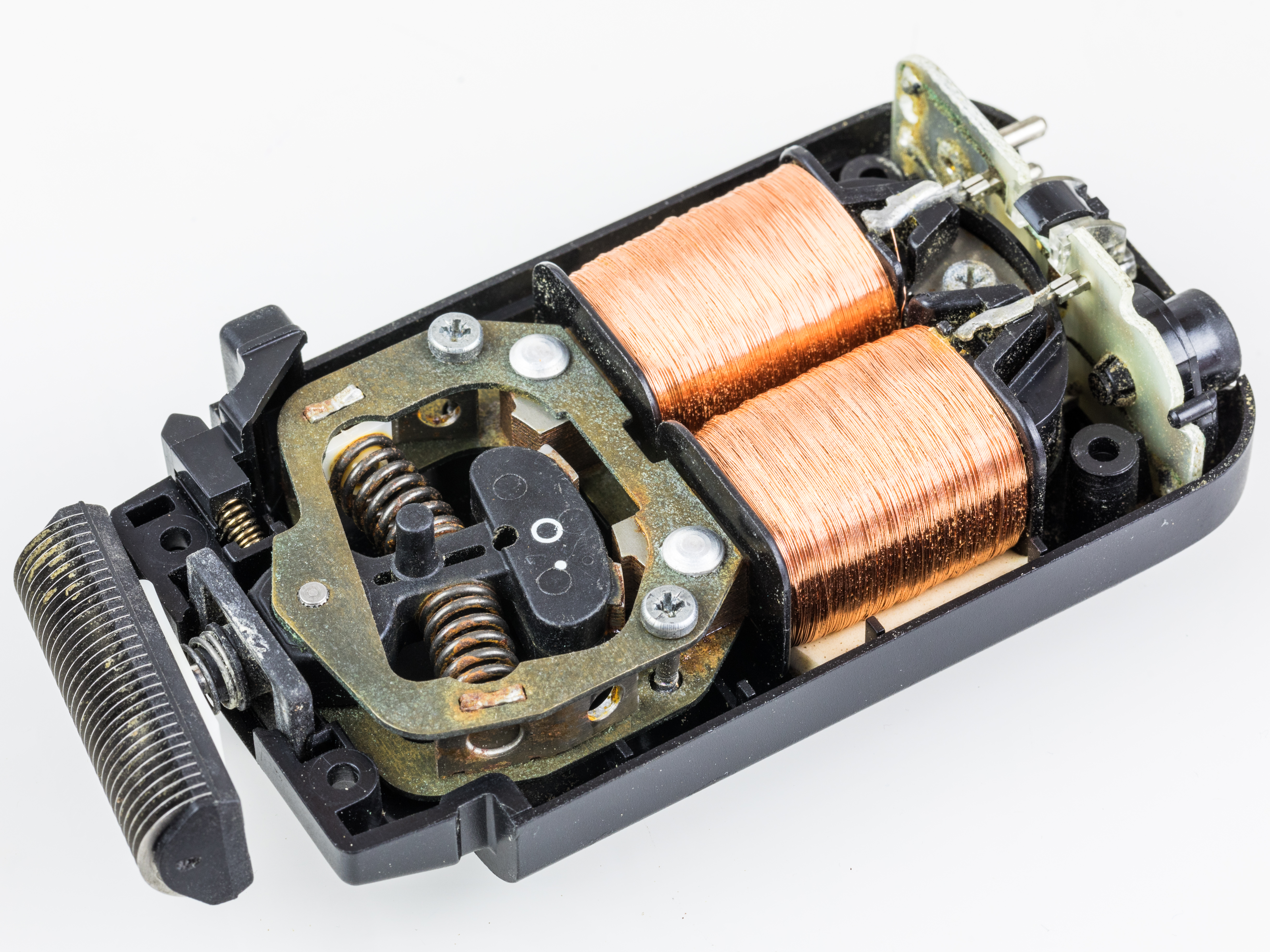

=== Battery-powered electric razors ===
In the late 1940s, the first battery-powered electric razors entered the market. In 1960, Remington introduced the first rechargeable battery-powered electric razor. Battery-operated electric razors have been available using rechargeable batteries sealed inside the razor's case, previously nickel cadmium or, more recently, nickel metal hydride. Some modern shavers use Lithium-ion batteries (which do not suffer from memory effect). Sealed battery shavers either have built-in or external charging devices. Some shavers may be designed to plug directly into a wall outlet with a swing-out or pop-up plug, or have a detachable AC cord. Other shavers have recharging base units that plug into an AC outlet and provide DC power at the base contacts (eliminating the need for the AC-to-DC converter to be inside the razor, reducing the risk of electric shock). In order to prevent any risk of electric shock, shavers designed for wet use usually do not allow corded use and will not turn on until the charging adapter cord is disconnected or the shaver is removed from the charging base.

=== Razor vs. trimmer ===
An electric razor and an electric trimmer are essentially the same devices by build, the major difference coming in terms of their usage and the blades that they come with.

Electric razors are made specifically for providing a clean shave. It has lesser battery power but more aggression towards clipping hair. Electric Trimmers, on the other hand, are not meant for clean shaves. They come with special combs fixed onto them that aid in proper grooming and trimming of the beard stubs to desired shapes and sizes.

=== Travel shavers ===
Some models, generally marketed as "travel razors" (or "travel shavers"), use removable rechargeable or disposable batteries, usually size AA or AAA. This offers the option of purchasing batteries while traveling instead of carrying a charging device.

== Water-resistance and wet/dry electric shavers ==
Many modern electric shavers are waterproof or water-resistant, allowing the user to shave in the shower and clean the shaver in water. In order to ensure electrical safety, the charging/power cord for the shaver must be unplugged from it before the unit is cleaned using water.

Some shavers are labeled as "Wet/Dry" which means the unit can be used in wet environments, for wet shaving. Such models are always battery-powered and usually the electronics will not allow turning the unit on while the charging adapter is plugged-in. This is necessary to ensure electrical safety, as it would be unsafe to use a plugged-in shaver in bathtub or shower.

== Lady shaver ==
A lady shaver is a device designed to shave a woman's body hair. The design is usually similar to a man's foil shaver. Often a shaving attachment is a feature of an epilator which is supplied as a separate head-attachment (different from the epilating one).

== Body hair shaver ==
Traditional men's shavers are designed for shaving facial hair. However, other electric shavers are made specifically for trimming or shaving body hair on areas like the chest, back, arms, underarms, and groin. These body shavers often include rounded blade tips or protective guards to reduce the risk of nicks and irritation on sensitive skin.

Some models are waterproof and can be used in the shower, and many come with adjustable comb attachments for trimming body hair to different lengths. Brands like Philips, Braun, and Manscaped offer dedicated body groomers that are marketed separately from facial razors.

== Head shaver ==
A head shaver is a type of electric shaver designed specifically for shaving the scalp. Unlike standard face shavers, head shavers often have flexible, multi-head rotary blades and ergonomic shapes that contour to the scalp, making it easier to achieve a smooth, even shave.

They are commonly used by men who prefer a clean-shaven head for style or due to hair loss. Most models are cordless, waterproof, and support both wet and dry shaving. Popular head shaver brands include Skull Shaver, Remington, and Freebird.
