= Pogonotomia =

Art of shaving

Pogonotomia is the art of shaving, from the Greek words πώγων pogon "beard" and τέμνω témno, to cut.

In 1772 French barber Jean-Jacques Perret (1730–1784) published a treatise called Pogonotomy, or The Art of Learning to Shave Oneself, a booklet detailing his observations on shaving. It also proposed the first safety razor. In 1762 he developed an extremely sharp razor meant to cut as much hair as would be possible. Perret's razor was later called the cut-throat razor.
