= Shaving =

Removal of hair with a razor or other sharp edged materials

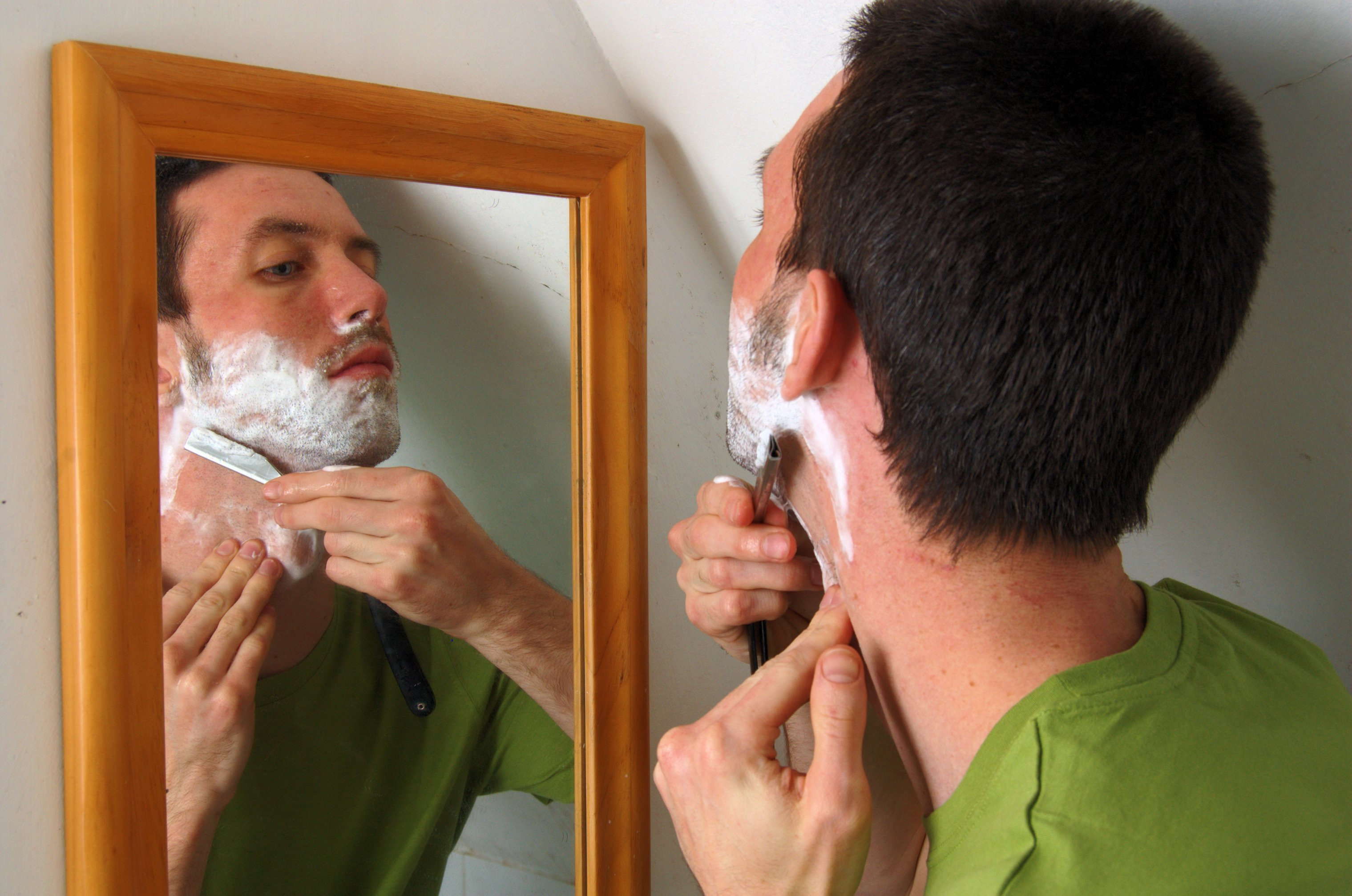
A man shaving his neck using a straight razor

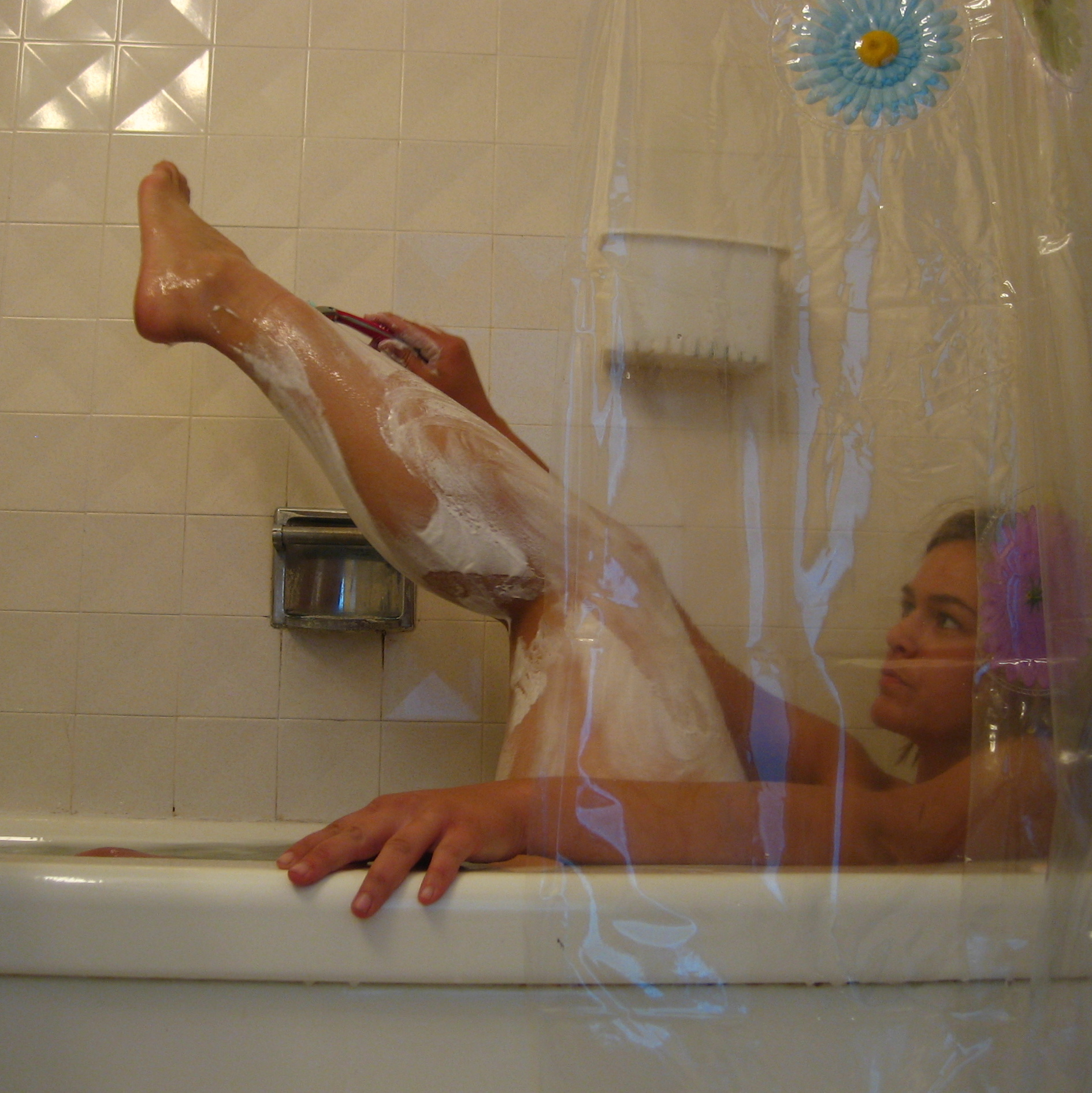
A woman leg shaving using a razor

Shaving is the removal of hair, by using a razor or any other kind of bladed implement, to slice it down—to the level of the skin or otherwise. Shaving is most commonly practiced by men to remove their facial hair and by women to remove their leg and underarm hair. A man is called clean-shaven if he has had his beard entirely removed.

Both men and women sometimes shave their chest hair, abdominal hair, leg hair, underarm hair, pubic hair, or any other body hair. Head shaving is much more common among men. It is often associated with religious practice, the armed forces, and some competitive sports such as swimming, bodybuilding, and extreme sports. Historically, head shaving has also been used to humiliate, punish, for purification or to show submission to an authority. In more recent history, head shaving has been used in fund-raising efforts, particularly for cancer research organizations and charitable organizations which serve cancer patients. The shaving of head hair is also sometimes done by cancer patients when their treatment may result in hair loss, and by people experiencing male pattern baldness.

== History ==
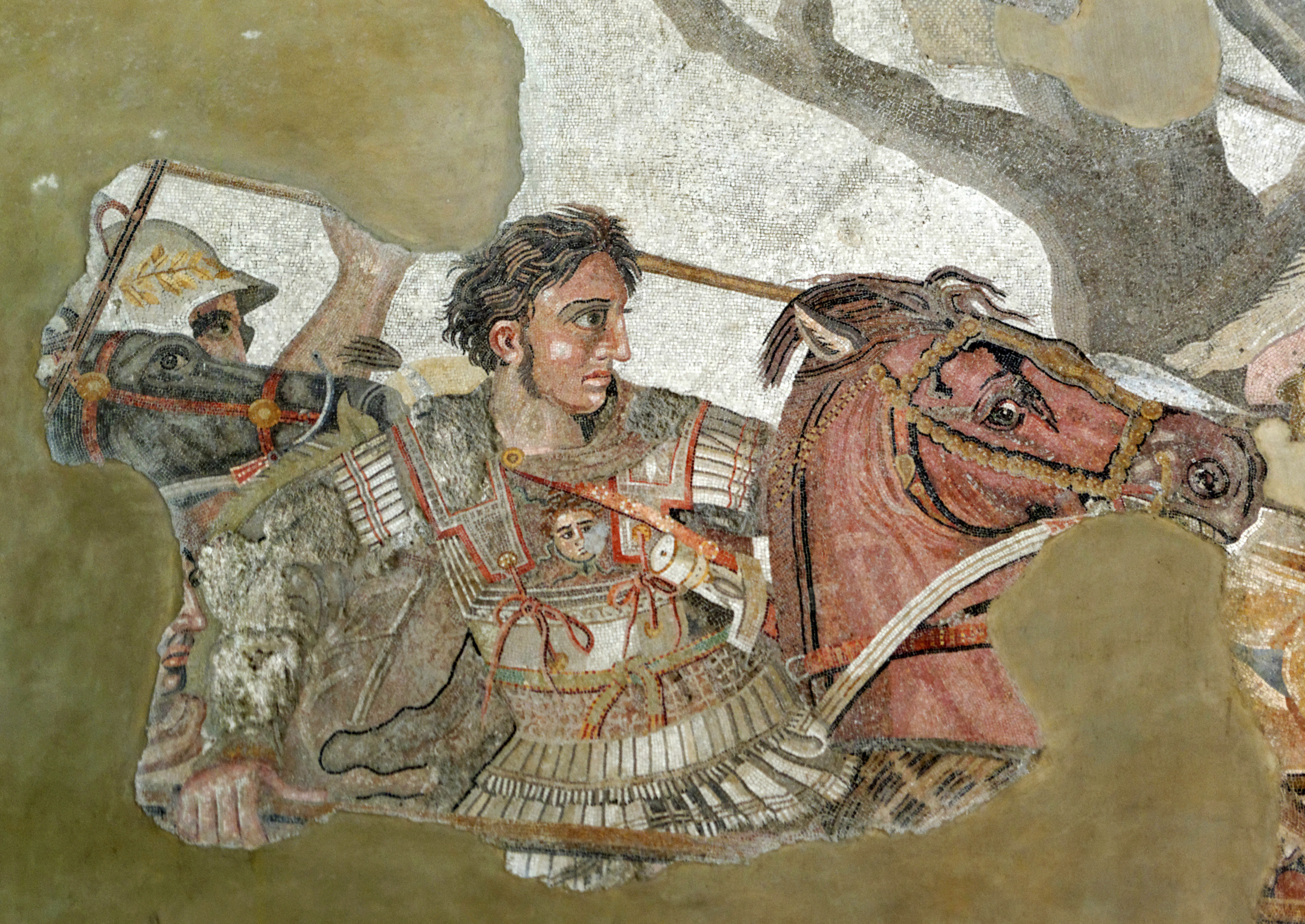
Alexander the Great's shaven image on the Alexander Mosaic, 2nd Century BC

Before the advent of razors, hair was sometimes removed using two shells to pull the hair out or using water and a sharp tool. Around 3000 BC when copper tools were developed, copper razors were invented. The idea of an aesthetic approach to personal hygiene may have begun at this time, though Egyptian priests may have practiced something similar to this earlier. Alexander the Great strongly promoted shaving the beard for Macedonian soldiers before battle because he feared the enemy would grab them. In some Native American tribes, at the time of contact with British colonists, it was customary for men and women to remove all body hair.

Straight razors have been manufactured in Sheffield, England since the 18th century. In the United States, getting a straight razor shave in a barbershop and self-shaving with a straight razor were still common in the early 1900s. The popularisation of self-shaving changed this. According to an estimate by New York City barber Charles de Zemler, barbers' shaving revenue dropped from about 50 percent around the time of the Spanish–American War (c. 1898) to 10 percent in 1939 due to the invention of the safety razor and electric razor.

Safety razors have existed since at least 1876 when the single-edge Star safety razor was patented by brothers Frederick and Otto Kampfe. The razor was essentially a small piece of a straight razor attached to a handle using a clamp mechanism. Before each shave the blade had to be attached to a special holder, stropped with a leather belt, and placed back into the razor. After a time, the blade needed to be honed by a cutler.

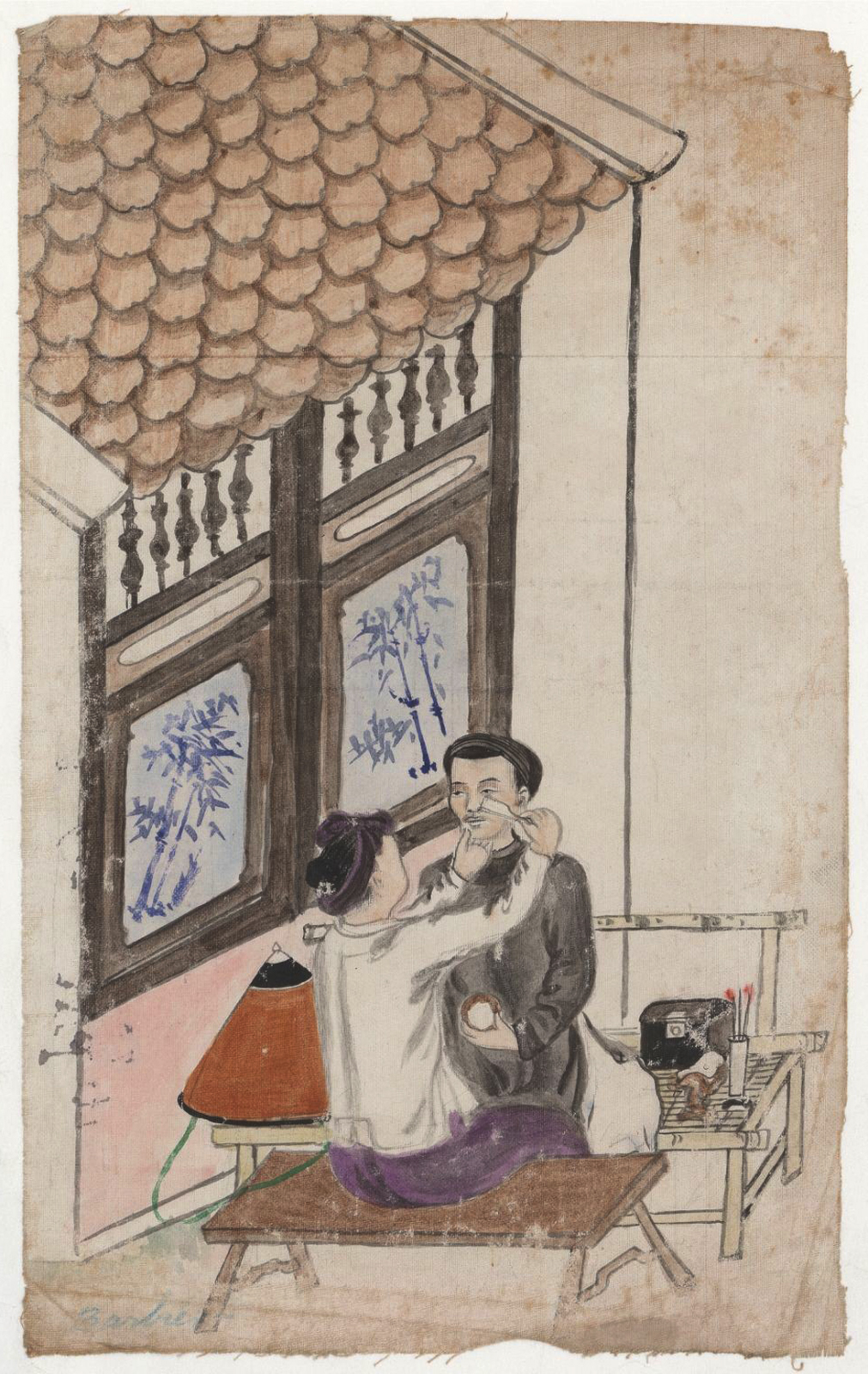
Shaving within Vietnam in 1923

In 1895, King Camp Gillette invented the double-edged safety razor, with cheap disposable blades sharpened from two sides. It took him until 1901 to build a working, patentable model, and commercial production began in 1903. The razor gained popularity during World War I when the U.S. military started issuing Gillette shaving kits to its servicemen: in 1918, the Gillette Safety Razor Company sold 3.5 million razors and 32 million blades. After the First World War, the company changed the pricing of its razor from a premium $5 to a more affordable $1 (equivalent to $90 and $18 in 2025, respectively), leading to another big surge in popularity. The Second World War led to a similar increase in users when Gillette was ordered to dedicate its entire razor production and most blade production to the U.S. military. During the war, 12.5 million razors and 1.5 billion blades were provided to servicemen.

In 1970, Wilkinson Sword introduced the 'bonded blade' razor, which consisted of a single blade housed in a plastic cartridge. Gillette followed in 1971 with its Trac II cartridge razor that utilised two blades. Gillette built on this twin blade design for a time, introducing new razors with added features such as a pivoting head, lubricating strip, and spring-mounted blades until their 1998 launch of the triple-bladed Mach3 razor. Schick launched a four-blade Quattro razor later the same year, and in 2006 Gillette launched the five-blade Fusion. Since then, razors with six and seven blades have been introduced.

Wholly disposable razors gained popularity in the 1970s after Bic brought the first disposable razor to market in 1974. Other manufacturers, Gillette included, soon introduced their own disposable razors, and by 1980 disposables made up more than 27 percent of worldwide unit sales for razors.

== Shaving methods ==
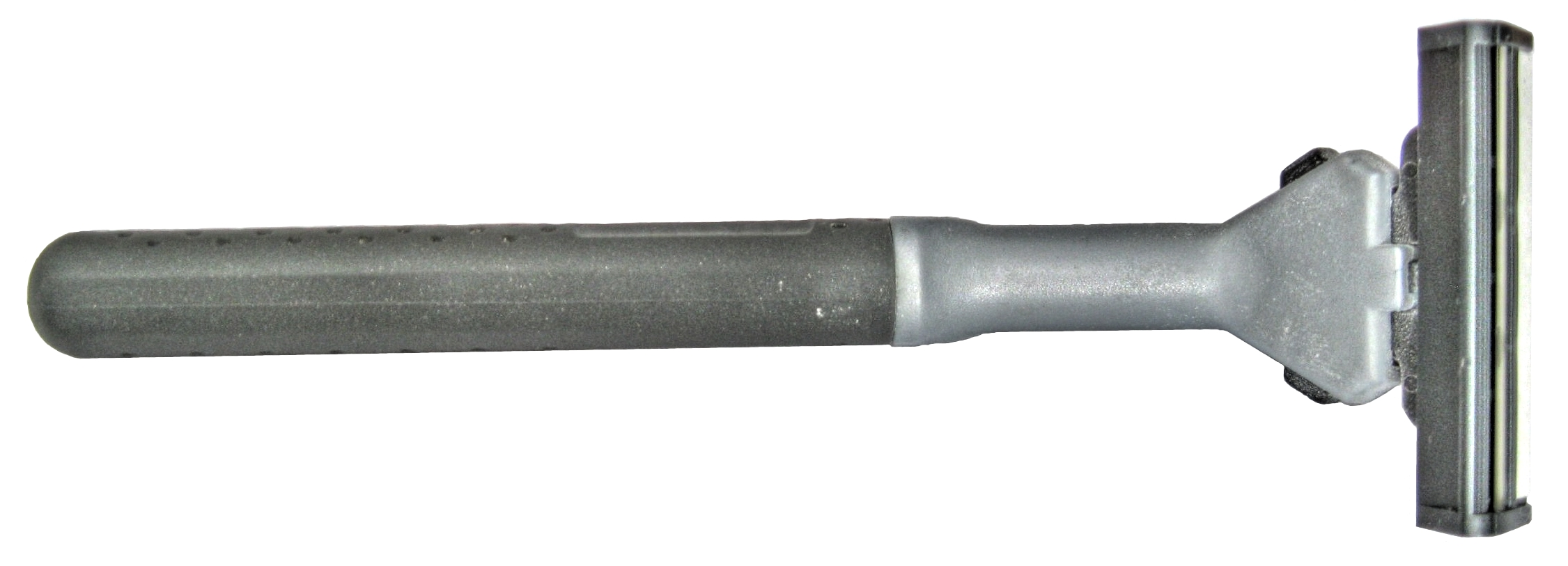
Cartridge razor with two blades

Shaving can be done with a straight razor or safety razor (called 'manual shaving' or 'wet shaving') or an electric razor (called 'dry shaving') or beard trimmer.

The removal of a full beard often requires the use of scissors or an electric (or beard) trimmer to reduce the mass of hair, simplifying the process.

=== Wet shaving ===
There are two types of manual razors: straight razor and safety razors. Safety razors are further subdivided into double-edged razors, single edge, injector razors, cartridge razors and disposable razors. Double-edge razors are named so because the blade that they use has two sharp edges on opposite sides of the blade. Current multi-bladed cartridge manufacturers attempt to differentiate themselves by having more or fewer blades than their competitors, each arguing that their product gives a greater shave quality at a more affordable price.

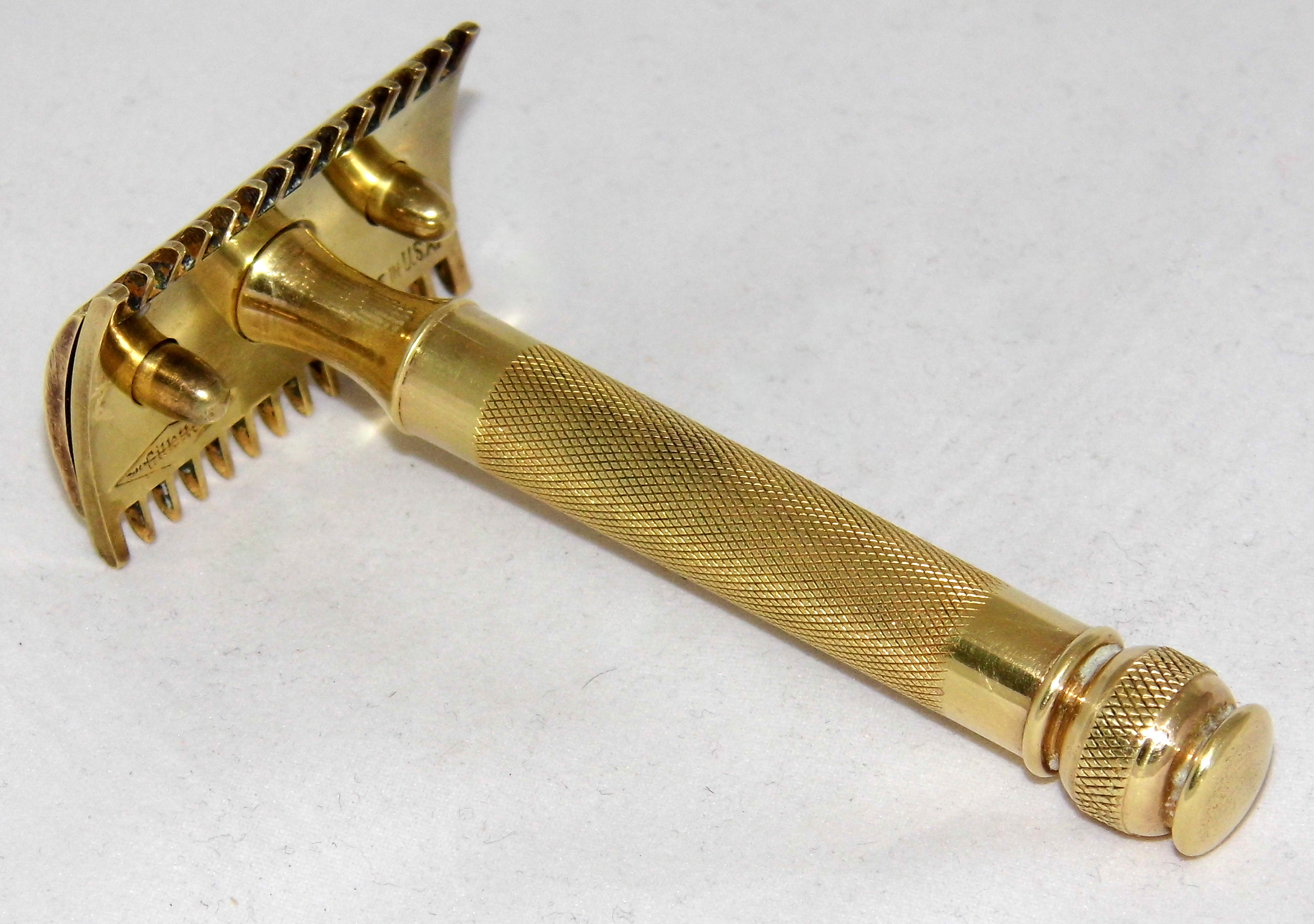
A Gillette 'Old Type' safety razor, the first razor to use double-edge blades

Before wet shaving, the area to be shaved is usually doused in warm to hot water by showering or bathing or covered for several minutes with a hot wet towel to soften the skin and hair. Dry hair is difficult to cut, and the required cutting force is reduced significantly once the hair is hydrated. Fully hydrated hair requires about 65% less force to cut, and hair is almost fully hydrated after two minutes of contact with room temperature water. The time required for hydration is reduced when using higher temperature water.

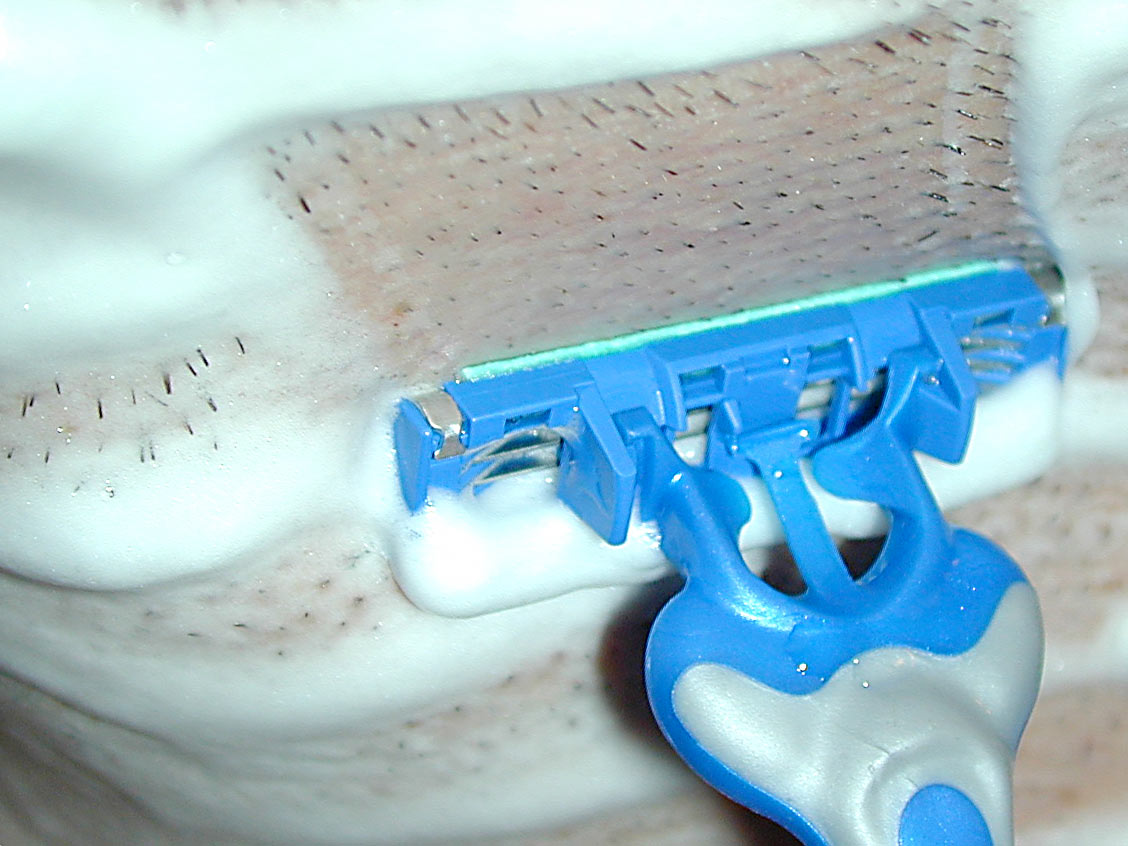
Closeup of a disposable razor shaving stubble off the underside of a chin. The direction of razor travel is the same as the direction of the stubble hairs or 'grain'

A lathering or lubricating agent such as cream, shaving soap, gel, foam or oil is normally applied after this. Lubricating and moisturizing the skin to be shaved helps prevent irritation and damage known as razor burn. Many razor cartridges include a lubricating strip, made of polyethylene glycol, to function instead of or in supplement to extrinsic agents. It also lifts and softens the hairs, causing them to swell. This enhances the cutting action and sometimes permits cutting the hairs slightly below the surface of the skin. Additionally, during shaving, the lather indicates areas that have not been addressed. When soap is used, it is generally applied with a shaving brush, which has long, soft bristles. It is worked up into a usable lather by the brush, either against the face, in a shaving mug, bowl, scuttle, or palm of the hand.

Since cuts are more likely when using safety razors and straight razors, wet shaving is generally done in more than one pass with the blade. The goal is to reduce the amount of hair with each pass, instead of trying to eliminate all of it in a single pass. This also reduces the risks of cuts, soreness, and ingrown hairs. Alum blocks and styptic pencils are used to close cuts resulting from the shave.

==== Aftershave ====
An aftershave lotion or balm is sometimes used after finishing shaving. It may contain an antiseptic agent such as isopropyl alcohol, both to prevent infection from cuts and to act as an astringent to reduce skin irritation, a perfume, and a moisturizer to soften the facial skin.

=== Electric shaving ===
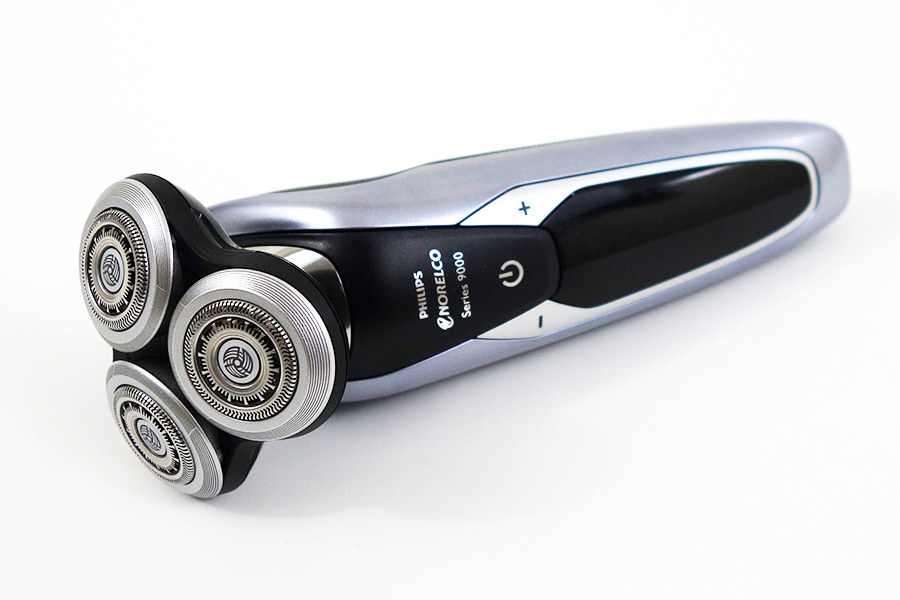
A rotary-design electric razor

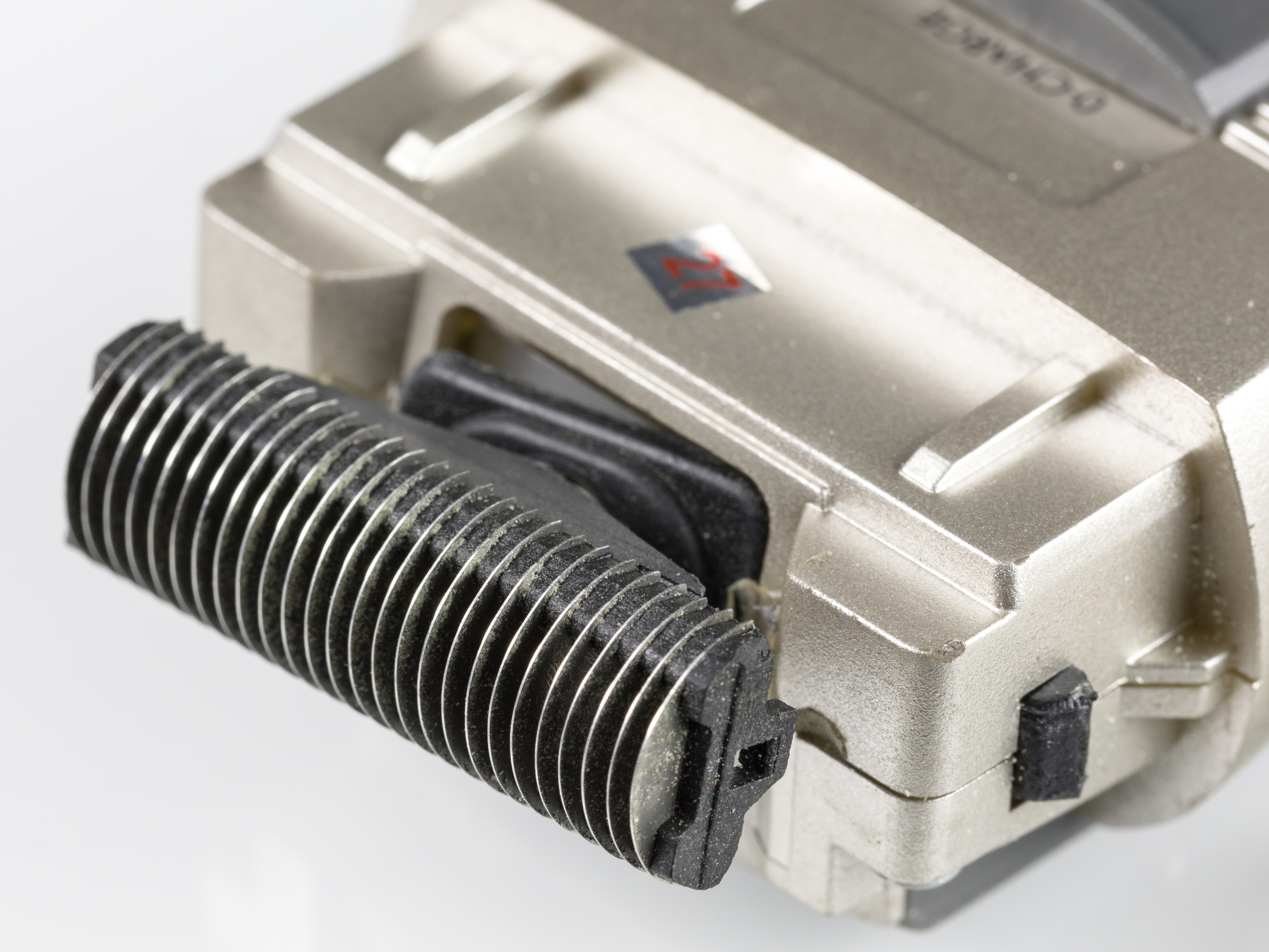
Oscillating blades of a foil-type shaver

The electric shaver (electric razor) consists of a set of oscillating or rotating blades, which are held behind a perforated metal screen which prevents them from coming into contact with the skin and behaves much like the second blade in a pair of scissors. When the razor is held against the skin, the hairs poke through the holes in the screen and are sliced by the moving blades. In some designs the blades are a rotating cylinder. In others they are one or more rotating disks or a set of oscillating blades. Each design has an optimum motion over the skin for the best shave and manufacturers provide guidance on this. Generally, circular or cylindrical blades (rotary-type shaver) move in a circular motion and oscillating blades (foil-type shaver) move left and right. Hitachi has produced foil-type shavers with a rotary blade that operates similarly to the blade assembly of a reel-type lawn mower. The first electric razor was built by Jacob Schick in 1928.

The main disadvantages of electric shaving are that it may not trim hair as closely as razor shaving does and it requires a source of electricity, usually a rechargeable battery. The advantages include fewer cuts to the skin, quicker shaving, and no need for water and lather sources (a wet shave). The initial cost of electric shaving is higher, due to the cost of the shaver itself, but the long-term cost can be significantly lower, since the cutting parts do not need replacement for several months and a lathering product is not required. Some people also find they do not experience ingrown hairs (pseudofolliculitis barbae, also called razor bumps), when using an electric shaver.

In contrast to wet shaving, electric shave lotions are intended to stiffen hair. Stiffening is achieved by dehydrating the follicles using solutions of alcohols and a degreaser such as isopropyl myristate. Lotions are also sold to reduce skin irritation, but electric shaving does not usually require the application of any lubrication. This is called Dry Shaving.

Mechanical shavers powered by a spring motor have been manufactured, although in the late 20th century they became rare. Such shavers can operate for up to two minutes each time the spring is wound and do not require an electrical outlet or batteries. Such type of shaver, the "Monaco" brand, was used on American space flights in the 1960s and 1970s, during the Apollo missions.

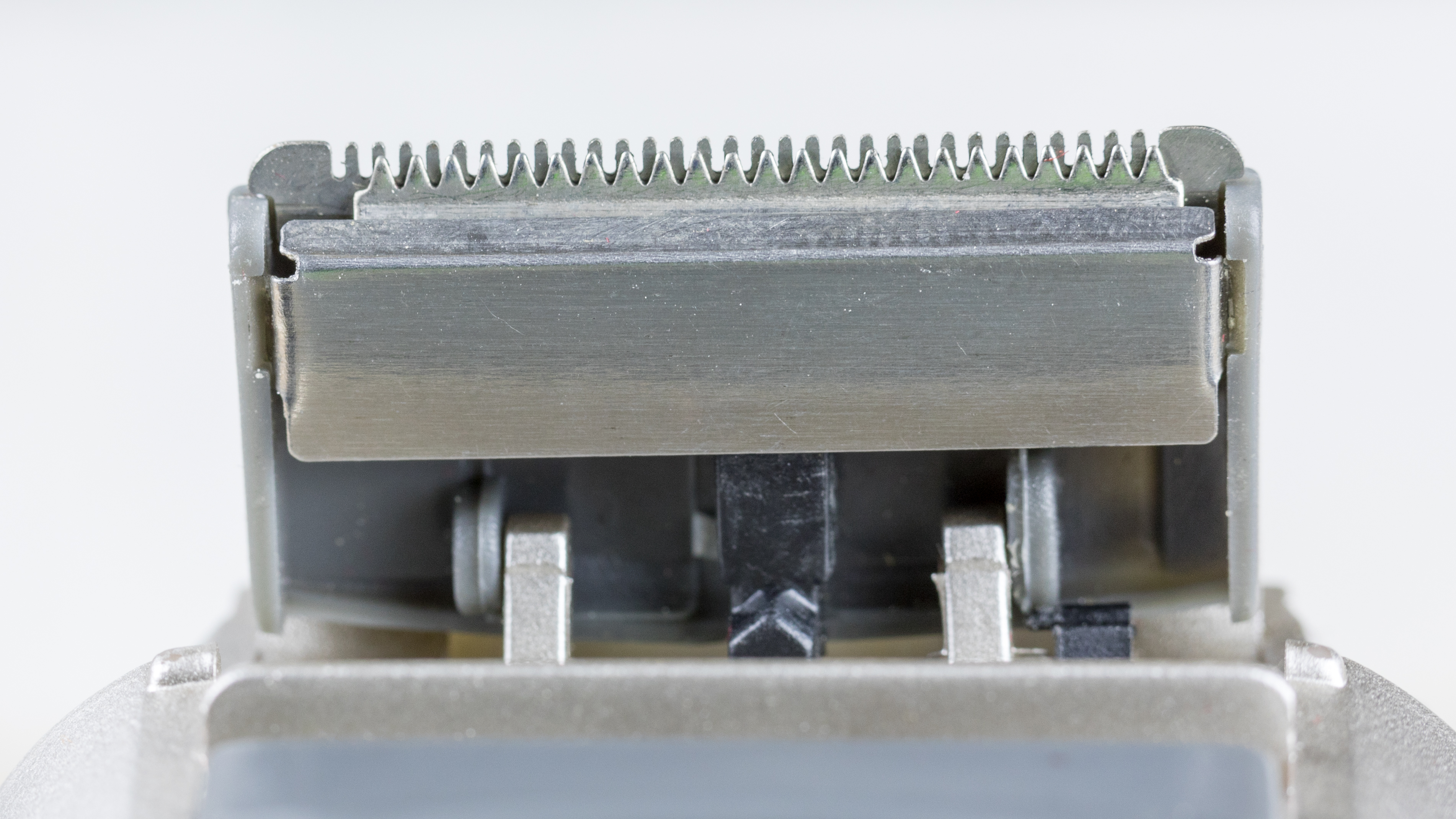
Blade set of a hair trimmer

=== Trimmer ===
A trimmer has two adjacent blades, each with teeth on its cutting edge. One blade oscillates alongside a stationary blade so that the teeth cut any hair that falls between them. The main advantage of a trimmer, unlike shaving tools, is that longer beards can be trimmed to a short length efficiently and effectively, including as preparation for shaving.

== Effects of shaving ==
=== Aberrations ===
Shaving can have numerous side effects, including cuts, abrasions, and irritation. Many side effects can be minimized by using a fresh blade, applying plenty of lubrication, shaving in the direction of hair growth, and avoiding pressing the razor into the skin. A shaving brush can also help to lift the hair and spread the lubrication. The cosmetic market in some consumer economies offers many products to reduce these effects; they commonly dry the affected area, and some also help to lift out the trapped hair(s). Some people who shave choose to use only single-blade or wire-wrapped blades that shave farther away from the skin.

Others have skin that cannot tolerate razor shaving at all; they use depilatory shaving powders to dissolve hair above the skin's surface, or grow a beard. Some anatomical parts, such as the scrotum, require extra care and more advanced equipment due to the uneven surface of the skin when the testicles shrivel during coldness, or its imbalance when the testicles hang low due to being warmer.

=== Cuts ===
Cuts from shaving can bleed for about fifteen minutes. Shaving cuts can be caused by blade movement perpendicular to the blade's cutting axis or by regular / orthogonal shaving over prominent bumps on the skin (which the blade incises). As such, the presence of acne can make shaving cuts more likely, and extra care must be exercised. The use of a fresh, sharp blade as well as proper cleaning and lubrication of skin can help prevent cuts. Some razor blade manufacturers include disposal containers or receptacles to avoid injuries to anyone handling the garbage.

=== Razor burn ===
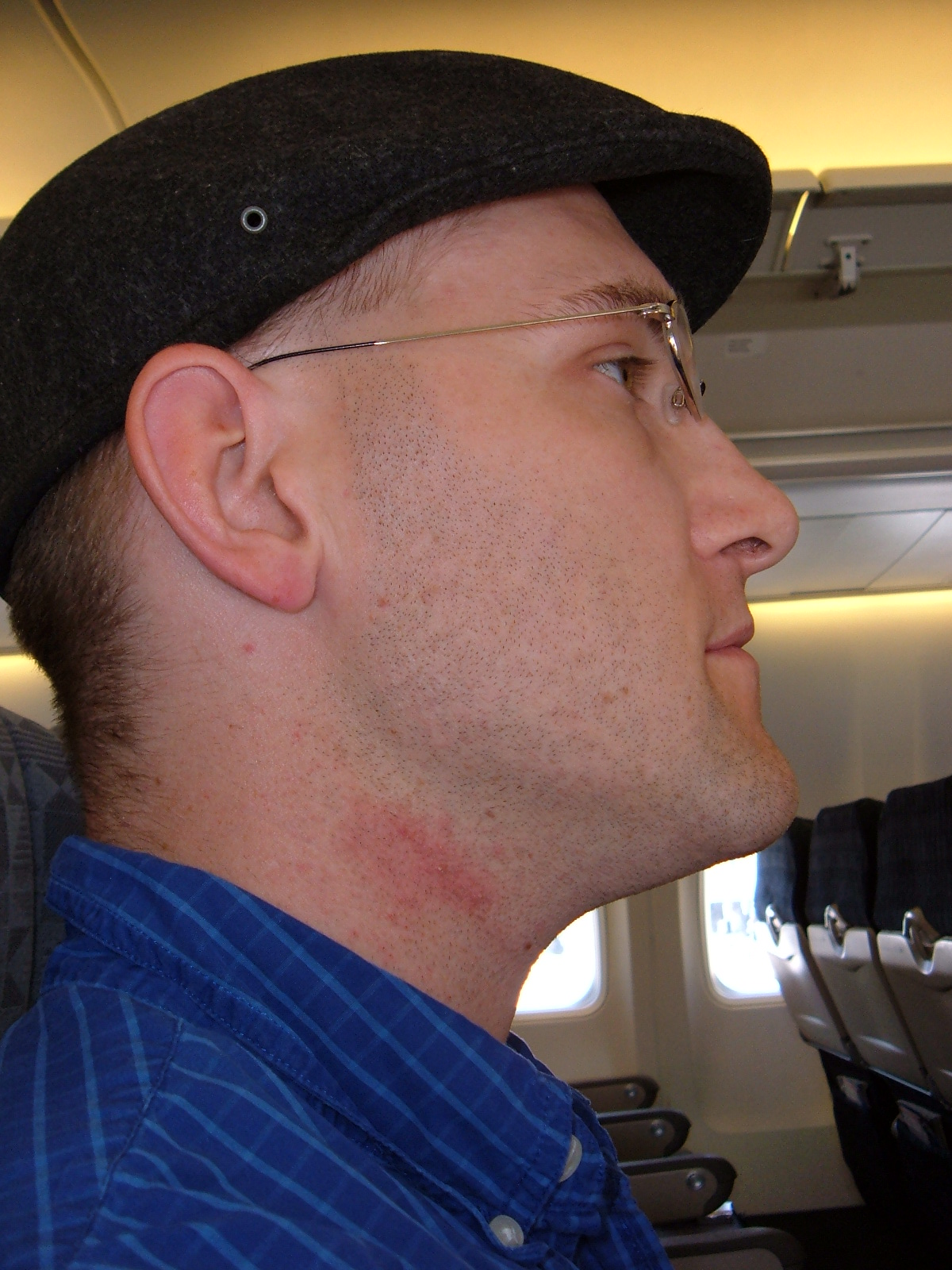
The red area on this man's neck is razor burn.

Razor burn is an irritation of the skin caused by using a blunt blade or not using proper technique. It appears as a mild rash 2–4 minutes after shaving (once hair starts to grow through sealed skin) and usually disappears after a few hours to a few days, depending on severity. In severe cases, razor burn can also be accompanied by razor bumps, where the area around shaved hairs get raised red welts or infected pustules. A rash at the time of shaving is usually a sign of lack of lubrication. Razor burn is a common problem, especially among those who shave coarse hairs on areas with sensitive skin like the bikini line, pubic hair, underarms, chest, and beard. The condition can be caused by shaving too closely, shaving with a blunt blade, dry shaving, applying too much pressure when shaving, shaving too quickly or roughly, or shaving against the grain.

Ways to prevent razor burn include keeping the skin moist, using a shaving brush and lather, using a moisturizing shaving gel, shaving in the direction of the hair growth, resisting the urge to shave too closely, applying minimal pressure, avoiding scratching or irritation after shaving, avoiding irritating products on the shaved area (colognes, perfumes, etc.) and using an aftershave cream with aloe vera or other emollients. Putting a warm, wet cloth on one's skin helps as well, by softening hairs. This can also be done by using pre-shave oil before the application of shaving cream. Essential oils such as coconut oil, tea-tree oil, peppermint oil, and lavender oil help to soothe skin after shaving. They have anti-inflammatory, antiseptic, and antibacterial properties.

In some cases multi-bladed razors can cause skin irritation by shaving too close to the skin. Switching to a single- or double-bladed razor and not stretching the skin while shaving can mitigate this.

One other technique involves exfoliating the skin before and after shaving, using various exfoliating products, included but not limited to, brushes, mitts, and loofah. This process removes dead skin cells, reducing the potential for ingrown hairs and allowing the razor to glide across the skin smoothly decreasing the risk of the razor snagging or grabbing causing razor burn.

=== Razor bumps ===
Pseudofolliculitis barbae is a medical term for persistent inflammation caused by shaving. It is also known by the initials PFB or colloquial terms such as razor bumps.

=== Myths ===
Shaving does not cause terminal hair to grow back thicker, coarser or darker. This belief arose because hair that has never been cut has a naturally tapered end as it emerges from the skin's hair follicle, whereas, after cutting, there is no taper. The cut hair may thus appear to be thicker, and feel coarser as a result of the sharp edges on each cut strand. The fact that shorter hairs are "harder" (less flexible) than longer hairs also contributes to this effect.

Hair can also appear darker after it grows back because hair that has never been cut is often lighter from sun exposure. In addition, as humans grow older, hair tends to grow coarser and in more places on the face and body. For example, teenagers may start shaving their face or legs at around 16, but as they age, hair will start to grow more abundantly and thicker, leading some to believe this was due to the shaving, but in reality is just part of the maturation process.

== Shaving in religion ==
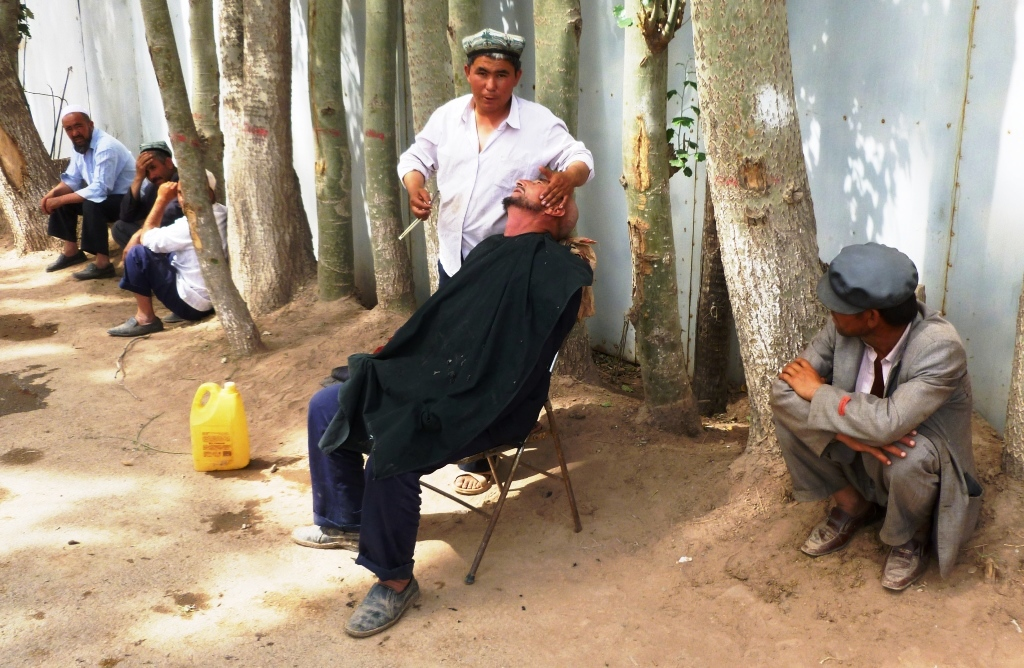
Man being shaved with straight razor by a barber; Kashgar, China

=== Hinduism, Buddhism, Jainism ===
Hindu, Jain, and Buddhist (usually only monks or nuns) temples have ceremonies of shaving the hair from the scalp of priests, nuns, and certain followers, as a symbol of their renunciation of worldly fashion and esteem.

In Hinduism, in certain communities, a child's birth hair is shaved off as part of a set of religious rites (samskaras).

=== Christianity ===
Amish men and some other plain peoples shave their beard until they are married, after which they allow it to grow but continue to shave their mustaches. Tonsure is the practice of some Christian churches.

=== Islam ===
==== Sunni ====
Leading classical Islamic jurist and theologian Abdullāh b. Abī Zayd says in his al-Risalah;

" [...] and the Prophet ordered that the beard be left alone and allowed to grow abundantly and that it not be trimmed. Malik said: “And there is no objection in trimming from its length when it becomes very long”. And what Malik said, more than one of the Companions and the Successors also said”."

Muslim jurists have unanimously agreed that shaving the entire head, and, to a lesser degree, cutting it during the Hajj pilgrimage is preferable. It is proven that Muhammad shaved his entire head, and he prayed for those who shaved their heads or cut their hair.

Islam also teaches followers to shave/pluck body hair such as pubic and armpit hair on a regular basis (40 days). Shia and Sunni narrations from the Prophet state that: "God's Prophet (May God bless him) said: "Anyone who believes in God and the Hereafter should not postpone shaving the pubic hair for more than forty days"."

==== Shia ====
According to the Shia scholars, the length of beard should not exceed the width of a fist. Trimming of facial hair is allowed, however, shaving it is forbidden (haram).

=== Judaism ===
Observant Jewish men are subject to restrictions on the shaving of their beards, as Leviticus 19:27 forbids the shaving of the corners of the head and prohibits the marring of the corners of the beard. The Hebrew word used in this verse refers specifically to shaving with a blade against the skin; rabbis at different times and places have interpreted it in many ways.

Tools like scissors and electric razors, which cut the hair between two blades instead of between blade and skin, are permitted.

=== Sikhism ===
Observant Sikhs also follow the practice of keeping their hair uncut.

== See also ==
- Androgenic hair
  - Facial hair
  - Leg hair
  - Pubic hair
  - Underarm hair
- Hair removal
  - Head shaving
  - Leg shaving
- Fraternal Order of Police v. City of Newark
- List of facial hairstyles
- Pogonotomia
