= Leg hair =

Hair on the leg areas of adolescent and adult humans

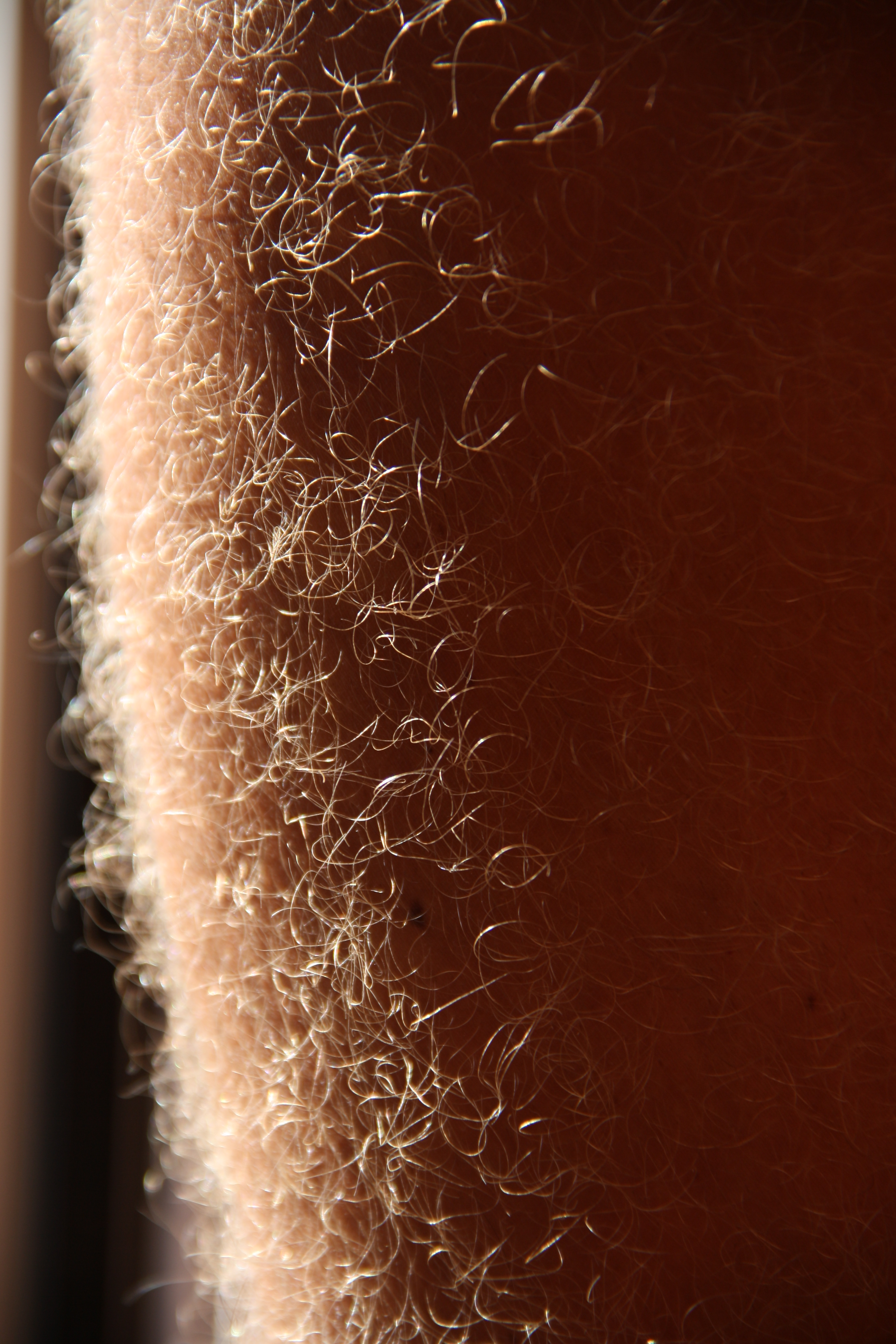
- Hair on a human leg

Leg hair is body hair that grows on the legs of humans, generally appearing after the onset of puberty. For aesthetic reasons and for some sports, people shave, wax, epilate, or use hair removal creams to remove the hair from their legs: see leg shaving.

The current Guinness World Record for world's longest leg hair belongs to Jason Allen of Tucson, Arizona at 8.84 inches (22.46 cm).

== Growth ==
The real action of leg hair takes place below the skin or the epidermis. The cells that are in the hair follicles divide and multiply. When the space fills up in the follicle it pushes older cells out and that is what becomes the leg hair. After the older cells become hard and leave the follicle, they form a hair shaft. The hair shaft is mostly made up of dead tissue and a protein that is known as keratin.

It is said that hair growth occurs during the "growing" phase of the follicle, and then retained as dead club hair during the "resting" phase. The old club hair might be lost within the following "growing" phase.

== Difference between men and women ==
Men generally have more body hair than women, due to higher levels of androgens. Three different types of hair are present on the human body. Body hair, or androgenic hair, is the terminal hair that develops on the human body during and after puberty. It is differentiated from the head hair and less visible vellus hair, which is much finer and lighter in color. The growth of androgenic hair is related to the level of androgens and the density of androgen receptors in the dermal papillae. Both must reach a threshold for the proliferation of hair follicle cells.

== Protein involved in hair growth ==
Fibroblast growth factor 5 (FGF5) is a secreted signaling protein. The expression of this protein is detected in hair follicles from the mice that scientists have experimented on. The hair follicles are localized to the outer root sheath during one of the phases of the hair growth cycle. Such experiments conclude that the protein FGF5 functions as an inhibitor when pertaining to hair elongation.

Seasonal changes are also known to affect hair growth. For instance, one experiment had concluded that the rate of hair growth for men and their beards was lowest in January and February and increased from March to July. (Northern hemisphere?)

== See also ==
- Beard
- Facial hair
- Arm hair
- Pubic hair
- Hair
- Hirsutism
- Trichophilia
- Foot hair
