= Head shaving =

Shaving the hair from a person's head

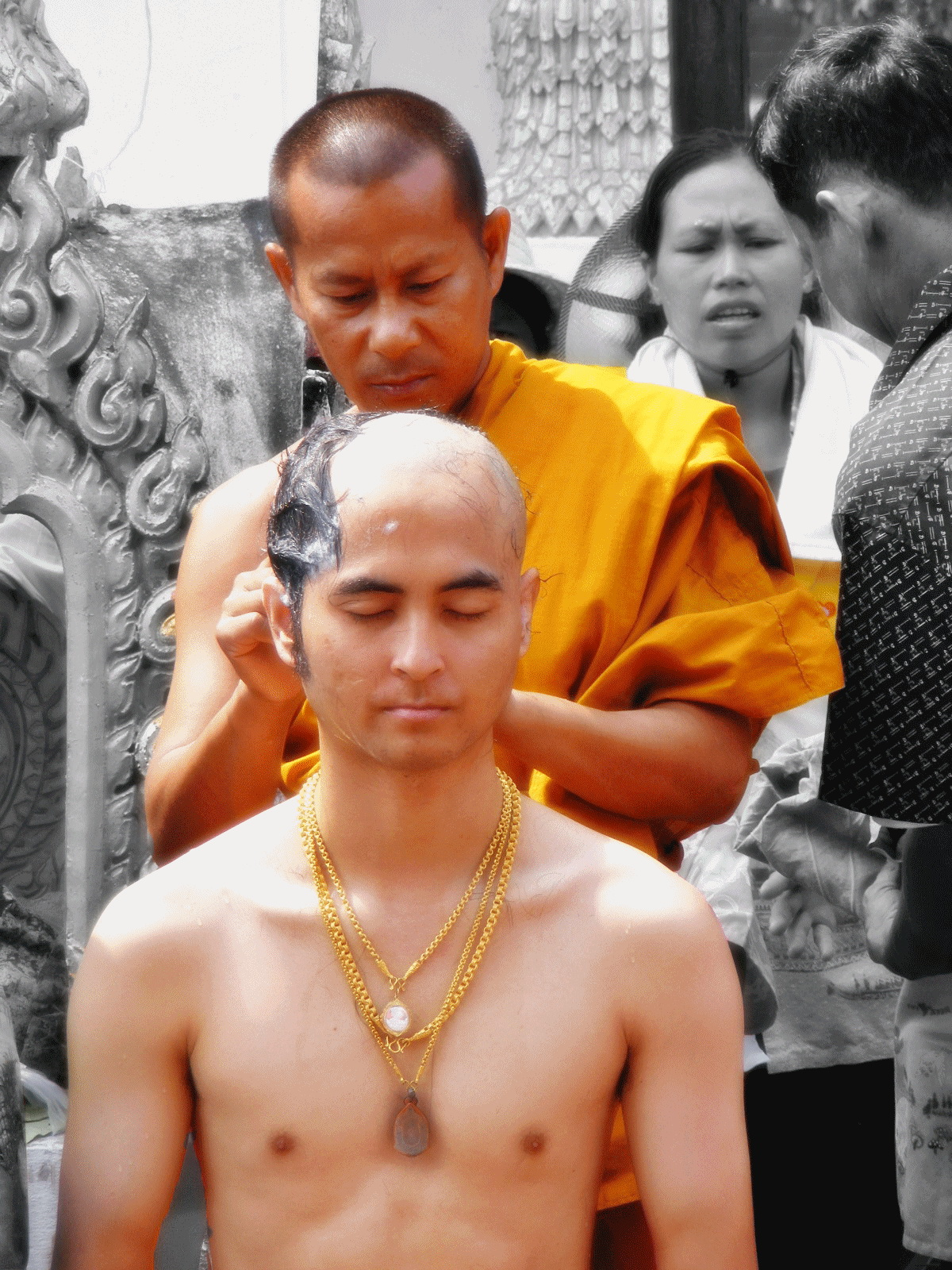
A Thai Buddhist monk shaving the head of a man preparing to also become a Buddhist monk; this is known as tonsure

Head shaving, or bald by choice, is the shaving of the hair from a person's head. People throughout history have shaved all or part of their heads for diverse reasons including aesthetics, convenience, culture, fashion, practicality, punishment, a rite of passage, religion, or style.

== History ==
=== Early history ===
The earliest historical records describing head shaving are from ancient Mediterranean cultures such as Egypt, Greece, and Rome. In Rome, there was a custom to offer the hair from a person's first shaving to the gods, a practice that likely came from the Greeks. The Egyptian priest class ritualistically removed all hair from head to toe by plucking it.

=== Religious significance ===
Many Buddhists and Vaisnavas, especially Hare Krishnas, shave their heads. Some Hindu and most Buddhist monks and nuns shave their heads upon entering their order, and Buddhist monks and nuns in Korea have their heads shaved every 15 days. Muslim men have the choice of shaving their heads after performing the Umrah and Hajj, following the tradition of committing to Allah, but are not required to keep it permanently shaved.

== As a symbol of subordination ==
=== Slavery ===
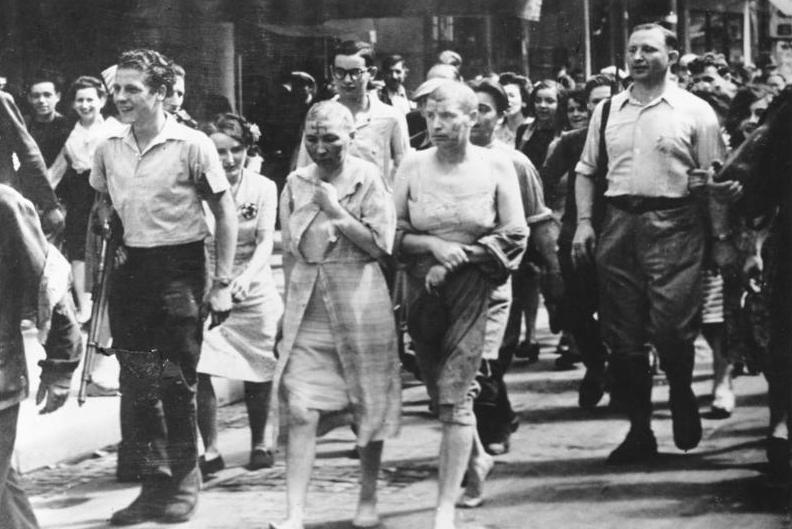
French women accused of collaborating with the Nazis being paraded through the streets barefoot, shaved, and with hakenkreuzes burned on their faces in 1944

In many cultures throughout history, cutting or shaving the hair on men has been seen as a sign of subordination. In ancient Greece and much of Babylon, long hair was a symbol of economic and social power, while a shaved head was the sign of a slave. This was a way of the slave-owner establishing the slave's body as their property by literally removing a part of their personhood and individuality.

=== Military ===
The practice of shaving heads has been widely used in the military. Although sometimes explained as being for hygiene reasons, the image of strict and disciplined conformity is also accepted as a factor. Upon the Allied invasion of Normandy during World War II, some Allied soldiers shaved their heads to deny any Nazis the opportunity to grab it during hand-to-hand combat.

For the new military recruit, it can be a rite of passage, and variations of it have become a badge of honor.

=== Prison and punishment ===
Prisoners commonly have their heads shaven to prevent the spread of lice, but it may also be used as a demeaning measure. Having the head shaved can be a punishment prescribed in law. Nazis punished people accused of racial mixing by parading them through the streets with shaved heads and placards around their necks detailing their acts.

During and after World War II, thousands of French women had their heads shaved in front of cheering crowds as punishment for either collaborating with the Nazis or having sexual relationships with Nazi soldiers during the war. Some Finnish women also had their heads shaved for allegedly having relationships with Soviet prisoners of war during the war.

== Practicality ==
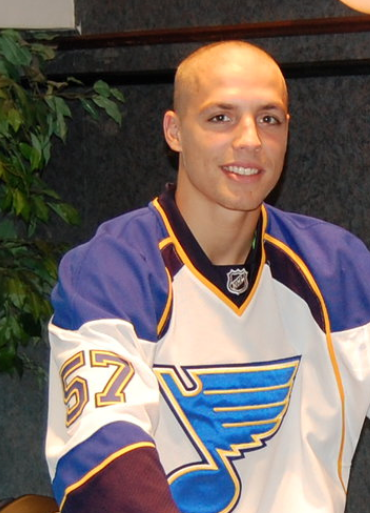
Hockey player David Perron with a shaved head by choice

=== Sport ===
Competitive swimmers, sprinters, and joggers sometimes seek to gain an advantage by completely removing all hair from their entire body to reduce drag while competing and reducing the amount of effort it takes to swim at high speeds.

=== Baldness ===
People experiencing hair loss may shave their heads in order to look more presentable, for convenience, or to adhere to a certain style or fashion movement.

Those with alopecia areata or pattern hair loss often choose to shave their heads, which has become much more common and socially acceptable since the 1990s.

== In popular culture ==
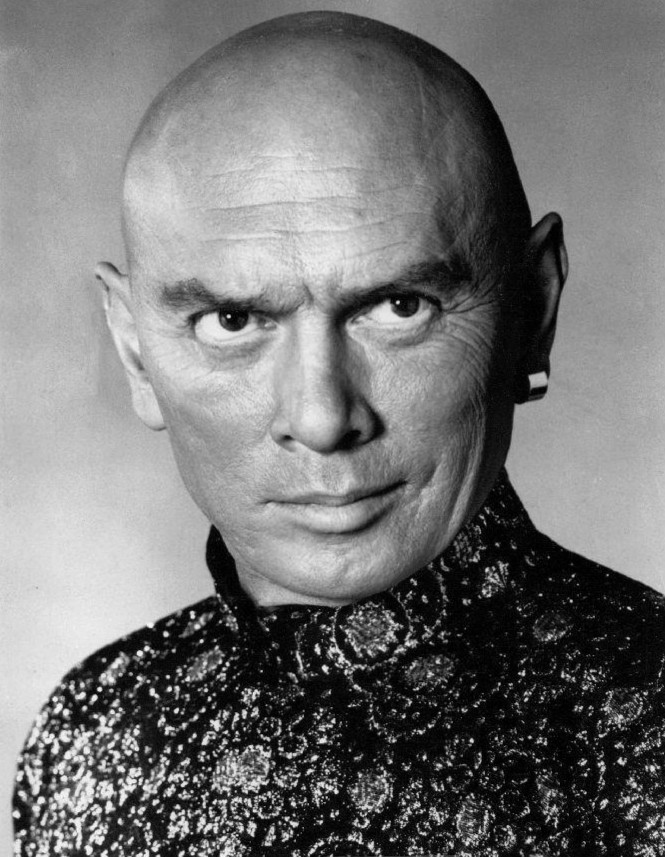
Actor Yul Brynner popularized a shaved head in the 1950s

In modern fiction, shaved heads are often associated with characters who display a stern and disciplined or hardcore attitude. Examples of this include characters played by Yul Brynner, Dwayne Johnson, Vin Diesel, Samuel L. Jackson, Telly Savalas, Sigourney Weaver, and Bruce Willis, as well as characters such as Agent 47 (whose physical appearance was based on his actor, the aforementioned David Bateson), Mr. Clean, Kratos, Krillin, Saitama, and Walter White. Baldness is sometimes an important part of these characters' biographies; for example, Saitama wanted to be a superhero and lost all of his hair in exchange for receiving superpowers. Shaved heads are also often associated with villains in fiction, such as Ernst Stavro Blofeld, Colonel Kurtz, Lex Luthor, Thanos, Bullseye, portrayed by Colin Farrell, and Alex Macqueen's version of the Master. A notable exception is Daddy Warbucks.

A goatee, usually of the Van Dyke variety, is often worn to complement the look or add sophistication; this look was popularized in the 1990s by professional wrestler "Stone Cold" Steve Austin. For most of the crime drama series Breaking Bad, Walter White (played by Bryan Cranston) wore a Van Dyke with a shaved head. In futuristic settings, shaved heads are often associated with bland uniformity, especially in sterile settings such as V for Vendetta and THX 1138. In the 1927 sci-fi film Metropolis, hundreds of extras had their heads shaved to represent the oppressed masses of a future dystopia. It is less common for female characters to have shaved heads, though some actresses have shaved their heads or used bald caps for roles.

=== Modern subcultures ===
==== Skinheads ====
In the 1960s, some British working-class youths developed the skinhead subculture, whose members were distinguished by short cropped hair (although they did not shave their heads down to the scalp at the time). This look was partly influenced by the Jamaican rude boy style. It was not until the skinhead revival in the late 1970s—with the appearance of punk-influenced Oi! skinheads—that many skinheads started shaving their hair right down to the scalp. Head shaving has also appeared in other youth-oriented subcultures such as the hardcore, death metal, black metal, metalcore, nu metal, hip hop, techno, and neo-nazi scenes.

==== Sexuality and gender ====
A sexual fetish involving head shaving is called haircut fetishism. While a shaved head on a man is often seen as a sign of authority and virility, a shaved head on a woman typically connotes androgyny, especially when combined with traditionally feminine signifiers. In the BDSM community, shaving a submissive or slave's head is often used to demonstrate powerlessness or submission to the will of a dominant.

=== Fundraising and support ===
==== Cancer ====
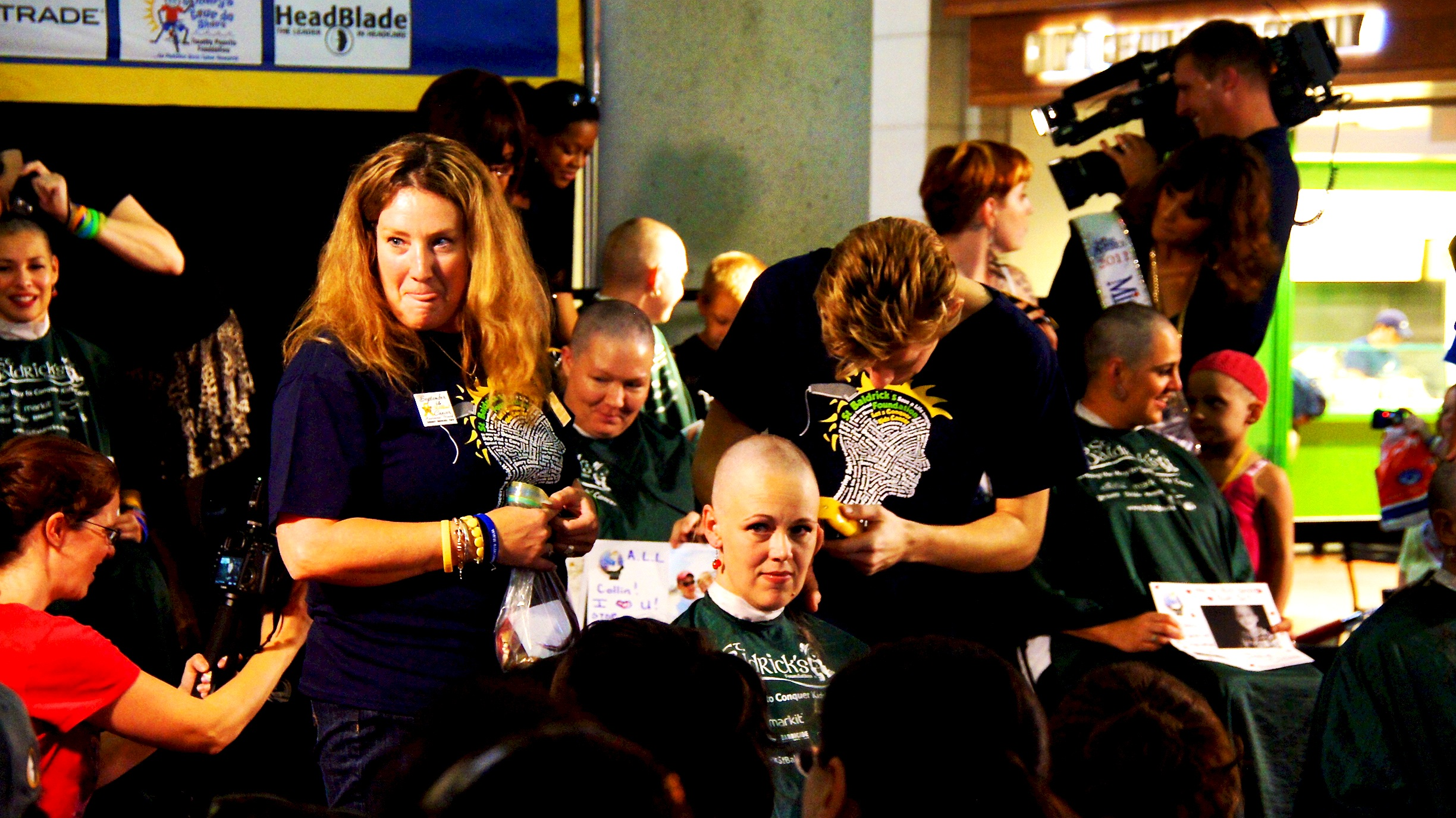
Women shaving their heads at the 46 Mommas event, a cancer-related fundraising and awareness program

Baldness is perhaps the most famous side effect of the chemotherapy treatment for cancer, and some people shave their heads before undergoing such treatment or after the hair loss starts to become apparent; some people chose to shave their heads in solidarity with cancer sufferers, especially as part of a fundraising effort.

==== Covhead-19 Challenge ====
During the early days of the COVID-19 pandemic in 2020, many countries imposed strict lockdown procedures and actively encouraged members of the public to self-isolate. Many people, particularly men, began to shave their heads during lockdown due to boredom and/or being unable to have their hair cut as barbershops were forced to stay closed. In the UK, a fundraising effort began to support its National Health Service, which suffered from the enormous pressure of the pandemic. The effort was started on Just Giving with a goal of £100,000; it encouraged people to shave their heads whilst also donating money to the NHS and was dubbed the "Covhead-19 Challenge". Various celebrities also took part.

== See also ==
- Barber – Person who cuts, dresses, grooms, styles and shaves males' hair or beards
- Baldness – Loss of hair from the head or body
- Buzz cut – Variety of very short hairstyle
- Depilation – Body hair removal
- Hair removal – Body hair removal
- List of hairstyles
- Mohawk hairstyle
- Razor – Device to remove body hair
- Shaving – Removal of hair with a razor or other sharp edged materials
- Skullet – Hairstyle
- Social role of hair
