= American Electrology Association =

Professional organization

- Abbreviation: AEA
- Formation: 1958
- Type: Professional body
- Legal status: Non-Profit Organization
- Purpose: To advance the electrology profession
- President: Bridgett Meggs, CPE
- Main organ: Board of Directors
- Website: www.electrology.com

According to the association, the American Electrology Association (AEA) is the largest professional membership organization for practitioners of electrolysis permanent hair removal.

Although its name says American, its membership is actually international.

== Certification ==
The Certified Professional Electrologist (CPE) exam and the IBEC state licensure exam are conducted by Prometric (a testing company), via computer-based testing at Prometric Centers.

CPE candidates apply/submit their documentation through the International Board of Electrologist Certification (IBEC), which is the AEA's own certification body.

Those passing the exam are known as Board Certified Electrologists, who hold the Certified Professional Electrologist (CPE) credential, maintained via continued education (75 Continuing Education Unit hours per 5 years).

In 2022, a member of the Association, Colette A. Kavanaugh, an electrologist, was appointed to the California Board of Barbering and Cosmetology, a gubernatorial appointment requiring California State Senate confirmation.

== See also ==
- Bikini waxing
- Male waxing
