= Waxing (disambiguation) =

Waxing is a temporary method of hair removal, which removes the hair from the root, including:

- Bikini waxing
- Male genital waxing

Waxing may also refer to:

- Waxing, any method of applying wax to a surface as a lubricant or to improve traction
  - Ski wax
  - Surfboard wax
  - Oil waxing
- Fruit waxing, a process of covering fresh fruit with wax to prevent water loss and retard shrinkage and spoilage
- Waxing moon, a lunar phase of the moon when it is approaching fullness (as opposed to waning)
