= Dean Faiello =

American criminal (born 1959)

- Born: August 31, 1959; Madison, New Jersey, US
- Died: New Jersey
- Occupations: Store maintenance, repairs; unlicensed aesthetician
- Status: Paroled
- Convictions: First-degree assault Unauthorized practice of profession
- Penalty: 20 years imprisonment

Dean Faiello is an American criminal formerly imprisoned at Attica Correctional Facility for the April 2003 death of Maria Cruz, whom he had presented himself to as a dermatologist. Faiello held neither a medical degree nor a license to practice medicine.

== Biography ==
=== Early life and education ===
Faiello was raised in Madison, New Jersey, graduating from Madison High School in 1977 (voted "most likely to succeed" by classmates). He enrolled in Rensselaer Polytechnic Institute in 1977, but left without graduating.

=== Early career ===
Faiello worked in construction before being employed at a day spa, where he became skilled at hair removal. In 1996, he began his own practice, SkinOvations, from an office on Park Avenue (later moving to an office on 133 East 73rd Street, and then to an office at 117 East 18th Street in Gramercy Park). The medical spa offered blood vessel removal, electrolysis, laser hair removal, laser skin treatments, tattoo removal, and facials.

In 1998, Faiello was charged with possession of a controlled substance, forgery, and possession of a forged instrument. He pleaded guilty to a misdemeanor count of possession of a forged instrument and was sentenced to three years' probation. On his website, Faiello claimed to hold a Master of Science degree from Rensselaer Polytechnic Institute (RPI) and the credential of Certified Professional Electrologist, despite it lapsing in 1998 after he failed to earn continuing education units required to maintain certification.

=== Personal life ===
Faiello was openly gay. His officemate, Dr. Laurie Polis described him as "young, good-looking, strapping, well-spoken, affable young man”.

== Crimes ==
=== Practicing medicine without a license ===
On October 6, 2002, the New York Post published an investigation into Faiello titled He'll Make Your Skin Crawl. He was arrested two days later on three counts of practicing medicine without a license but was released on bail with the condition that he refrain from treating patients. However, Faiello began to see patients out of an apartment at 115 West 16th Street.

=== Maria Cruz death ===
On April 13, 2003, Filipino-American investment banker Maria Cruz had an appointment with Faiello for laser treatment of scars. According to Faiello, Cruz went into convulsions after he injected more than one vial of lidocaine (a clinical numbing agent) into her tongue. In Faiello's December 2022 interview with ABC News' David Scott, during the ABC 20/20 news special Doctor Deceit, he contradicts his prior account, alleging Cruz exhibited "laboured breathing" for "about ten minutes" after he injected her legs with "too many vials of lidocaine," then proceeded to perform the laser treatment for scarring on her inner thighs while she was unresponsive. Faiello had completed the same procedure on Cruz over a dozen times before without her experiencing an allergic reaction to lidocaine. He was not licensed to perform this procedure, admitting to doing it at least 14 times on Cruz alone. He went on to claim that after some time, Cruz "had bubbles coming from her mouth" and "her body went limp". By his own account, he delayed calling for help, allegedly attempting CPR but "could not get her to start breathing again." He states that although he was certified in electrolysis for hair removal, he lacked proper training for handling patients in shock and admitted he didn't know how to check for a pulse. He admitted walking away while he believed she was "dying of shock". Faiello later called a doctor he knew personally to explain his version of what happened to Cruz. According to Vanity Fair reporter Bryan Burrough, the doctor told him to either call 911 or rush Cruz to a hospital emergency room.

Instead of helping Cruz, Faiello shoved Cruz's body into a black suitcase, which had been stolen days earlier from his housemate, Mark Ritchey. Faiello claims he put the suitcase containing Maria Cruz in his car, drove straight home, and then left her in the trunk for two days before finally moving her body into his garage, which was undergoing renovations. It is unclear whether or not Maria Cruz was still alive when Faiello began to try to cover up his actions. Cruz's wallet and purse were discovered by Faiello's housemate inside a black gym bag placed under a rafter in the unfinished ceiling of the garage in August 2003, just one month after Faiello was kicked out. He later admitted in June 2003, nearly three months after Cruz was killed, that he had buried Cruz's body underneath the garage before pouring cement, right before a sale of the house was closed.

After homicide detective Brian Ford received a tip from Faiello's ex-boyfriend, Greg Bach, Maria Cruz's body was recovered from the property (now occupied by new homeowners) by law enforcement from the New York Attorney General's Office on February 18, 2004. Following Faiello fleeing town right after law enforcement questioned him about his appointment with Cruz the day she went missing, Bach began to question whether it was possible his ex-boyfriend could've had something to do with her disappearance. After a mutual friend of Bach and Faiello's told him about a phone call he received from a distressed Faiello in April 2003, asking what to do about a woman he thought had gone into "anaphylatic shock," Bach realized that call took place right when Cruz went missing. In the aftermath of the call between the mutual friend and Faiello, they both realized Faiello lied when he stated he got the woman's medical help and that she was fine. With Faiello gone, Bach searched the house, and while looking at the garage, he recalled Faiello using concrete just before moving out. Bach remembered how uncharacteristically secretive he was about the project and his overreaction when Bach walked in on him pouring concrete. According to New York state police Detective Lt. T.J. Moroney, Bach's information "gave us the break in the investigation we were hoping for."

=== Criminal charges ===
Faiello fled United States law enforcement in September 2003, entering Costa Rica on a three-month visa. During this time, he continued using his real name and convinced a local couple of modest financial means that took him in to relocate to a nicer house Faiello wanted and pay the rent for him. After law enforcement located Faiello, they issued a warrant for his arrest to Costa Rican authorities, leading to his arrest on February 26, 2004, at a resort in north-western Costa Rica. While imprisoned in Costa Rica, he fought extradition back to the United States for months by hiring an immigration attorney who asked the same Costa Rican couple to legally adopt Faiello as a son, despite being much older than them; exploiting a loophole in Costa Rica's extradition agreement with the US that does not allow Costa Rican citizens to be extradited. This plan ultimately failed when a judge denied the adoption, stating in his ruling that "...the adoptee is older than his adopters," and Faiello was returned to the United States 2–3 days later, in May 2005. He was charged by the New York State District Attorney's Office with second-degree murder in the death of Maria Cruz. In October 2006, three years after Maria Cruz's murder, during a pre-trial hearing, he admitted to the Manhattan District Supreme Court Judge that Maria Cruz came to his office for a scheduled procedure on the day she went missing. On December 4, 2006, he entered into a plea agreement, pleading guilty to one count of first-degree assault and practicing medicine without a medical license, in exchange for a 20-year prison sentence.

=== Plea Agreement ===
During the sentencing hearing, the judge expressed his displeasure with Faiello's statement before the court:

Well, I see you read that statement. And it rang a little hollow to me.

Certainly it was not from the heart as you read it verbatim from your statement, because we know that you are heartless, which was demonstrated by your actions.
However, this was a negotiated plea which was negotiated by your attorney and the district attorney's office, which I accepted. So I will honour that negotiation and that plea.
And for your senseless and depraved act, I am sentencing you to a determinate sentence of twenty years to be followed by five years of post-release supervision.

On the original indictment you are sentenced to the maximum of one and a third to four.

In January 2022, Faiello was paroled early after serving 18 years of his 20-year sentence at Attica Correctional Facility, a maximum security New York state prison in Attica, New York. Faiello says he became a Quaker during his time in prison. He has yet to address discrepancies in his statements, including his claim that Maria Cruz's sister, who travelled from the Philippines to New York after reporting her missing, called him twice and left voicemails pleading for information about her sister's whereabouts. The New York Attorney General's Office has yet to comment on either plea deal it has given to Faiello and whether or not Maria Cruz's family agreed to reduce the second-degree murder charge down to one count of first-degree assault.
