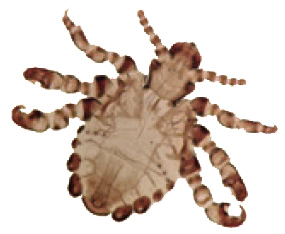
- Pthirus gorillae
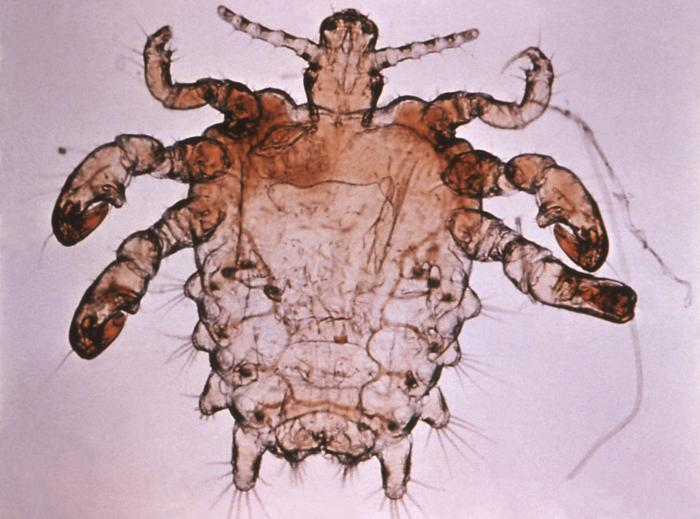
- Pthirus pubis

Scientific classification
- Kingdom: Animalia
- Phylum: Arthropoda
- Clade: Pancrustacea
- Class: Insecta
- Order: Psocodea
- Suborder: Troctomorpha
- Infraorder: Phthiraptera
- Parvorder: Anoplura
- Family: Pthiridae; Ewing, 1929
- Genus: Pthirus; Leach, 1815

Type species
- Pediculus pubis Linnaeus, 1758

Species
- P. gorillae Ewing, 1927; P. pubis (Linnaeus, 1758)

Synonyms
- Phthirus Leach, 1817

= Pthirus =

Genus of lice

Pthirus is a genus of lice. There are only two extant species, and they are the sole known members of the family Pthiridae. Pthirus gorillae infests gorillas, and Pthirus pubis afflicts humans, and is commonly known as the crab louse or pubic louse. The two species diverged some 3.3 million years ago.

Since 1958 the generic name Pthirus has been spelled with pth rather than phth, despite this being based on a misspelling of the Greek-derived phthirus.

A three-gene phylogeny (largely reproduced in a later phylogenomic analysis, which included fewer taxa of this genus) is:

- 47.6
  - Polyplax serrata
  - 27.4
    - 16.2
      - 5.9
        - 0.8
          - Pediculus humanus capitis
          - Pediculus humanus humanus
        - Pediculus schaeffi
      - 2.9
        - Pthirus pubis
        - Pthirus gorillae
    - 17.2
      - Pedicinus hamadryas
      - 4.3
        - Pedicinus badii
        - Pedicinus pictus

Labels below nodes are estimated divergence times (Mya).
