= CEUS =

Ceus or CEUS may refer to:

- Department of Central Eurasian Studies (Indiana University)
- Steward Ceus, born 1987, Haitian footballer
- Contrast-enhanced ultrasound
- CEUs, plural of Continuing education unit
- Central and Eastern U.S., in Active fault
- Coalition for a Solidary Europe, an electoral list of regionalist parties formed for the 2019 European Parliament election in Spain.

== See also ==
- CEU (disambiguation)
