= Hot wax =

Hot wax may refer to:

- Hot Wax (album), by Grant Hart, 2009
- Hot Wax Records, an American record label
- HotWax, British rock band
- "Hotwax", a song by Beck from Odelay, 1996
- "Hot Wax", a song by King Gizzard & the Lizard Wizard from Oddments, 2014

== See also ==
- Waxing, a method of hair removal
- Wax play, a form of sensual play
- Encaustic painting, or hot wax painting
- Wax
- Waxing (disambiguation)
