= CEU =

CEU may refer to:

== Education ==
- Central European University in Vienna, Austria, and Budapest, Hungary
- Centro Escolar University, a comprehensive higher education institution in the Philippines
- College of Eastern Utah, in Price, Utah
- Centro de Estudios Universitarios, Catholic educational foundation in Spain
- Continuing Education Units, professional development credits in the United States

== Transport ==
- Car Equivalent Units, unit to measure the capacity of vehicle or car carriers.

== Others ==
- Céu (born 1980), Brazilian indie singer-songwriter
- Constructional Engineering Union, former UK trade union merged into AEEU

== See also ==
- CEUS (disambiguation)
