= Pediculosis pubis =

Infestation by the pubic louse

- Other names: Crabs, pubic lice, phthiriasis, phthiriasis pubis
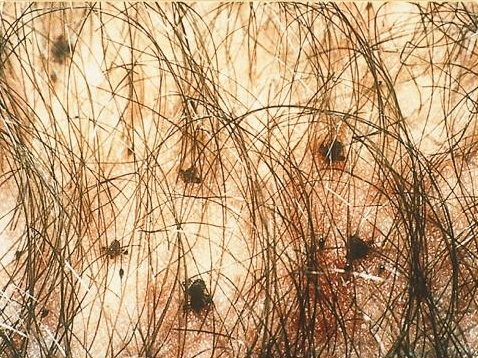
- Pubic lice in genital area
- Specialty: Infectious disease
- Symptoms: Itch, scratch marks, grey-blue marks, visible lice and nits
- Complications: Secondary bacterial infection
- Causes: Pubic louse
- Risk factors: Sexual activity, crowded situations
- Diagnostic method: Direct vision of lice with or without magnifying glass
- Treatment: Application of permethrin containing lotions; Removing nits with comb; In some instances, shaving the area as well as doing the steps above

Pediculosis pubis (also known as crabs and pubic lice) is an infestation by the pubic louse also known as the crab louse, Pthirus pubis, a wingless insect which feeds on blood and lays its eggs (nits) on mainly pubic hair. Less commonly, hair near the anus, armpit, beard, eyebrows, moustache, and eyelashes may be involved. It is usually acquired during sex, but can be spread via bedding, clothing and towels, and is more common in crowded conditions where there is close contact between people.

The main symptom is an intense itch in the groin, particularly at night. There may be some grey-blue discolouration at the feeding site, and eggs and lice may be visible. Scratch marks, crusting and scarring may be seen, and there may be signs of secondary bacterial infection.

Diagnosis is by visualising the nits or live lice, either directly or with a magnifying glass. Investigations for other sexually transmitted infections (STIs) are usually performed.

First line treatment usually contains permethrin and is available over the counter. Two rounds of treatment at least a week apart are usually required to kill newly hatched nymphs. Washing bedding and clothing in hot water kills the lice, and transmission can be prevented by avoiding sexual contact until no signs of infestation exist. Eggs may be removed by combing pubic hair with a comb dipped in vinegar. Sexual partners should be evaluated and treated.

Infestation with pubic lice is found in all parts of the world and occurs in all ethnic groups and all levels of society. Worldwide, the condition affects about 2% of the population.

== Signs and symptoms ==
The onset of symptoms is typically three weeks after the first infestation of lice and is mainly an intense itch in the pubic area and groin, particularly at night, resulting from an allergic reaction to the saliva of feeding lice. In some infestations, a characteristic grey-blue or slate coloration macule appears (maculae caeruleae) at the feeding site, which may last for days. Nits or live lice may be seen crawling on the skin. Louse droppings may be noticed as a black powder in the underwear.

Scratch marks, crusting, scarring, rust-colored faecal material, blood stained underwear and secondary bacterial infection may sometimes be seen. Large lymph nodes in the groin and armpits may be felt. Some people with pubic lice infestation may not have any symptoms.

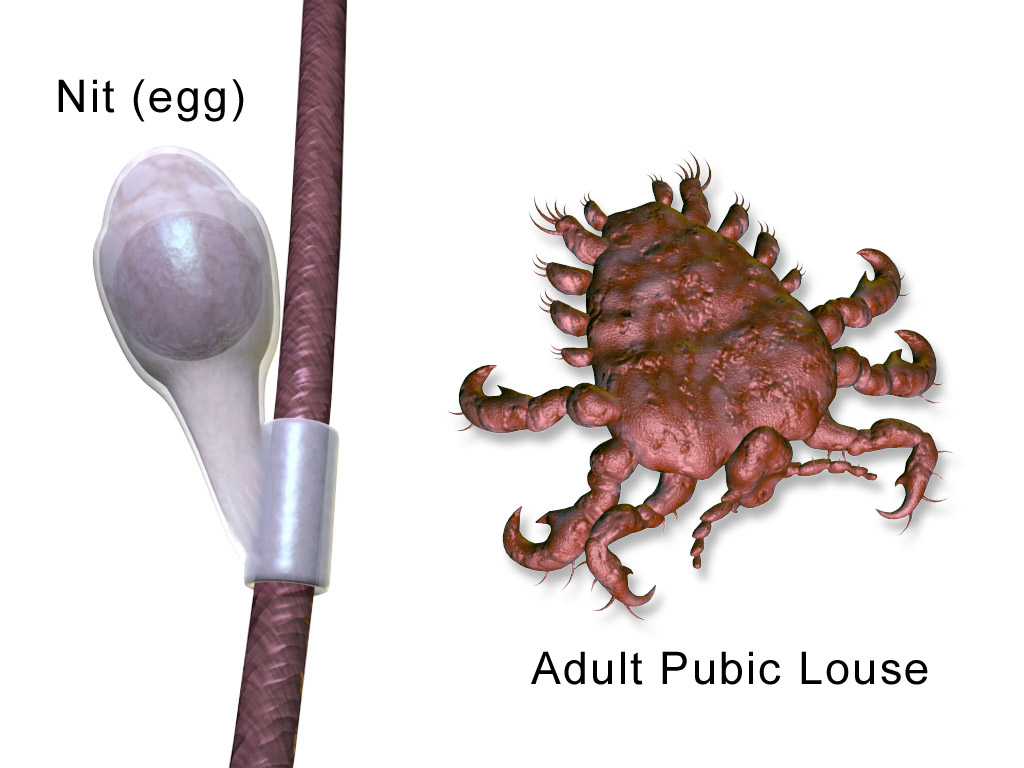
Pubic lice lay eggs on hair shaft.

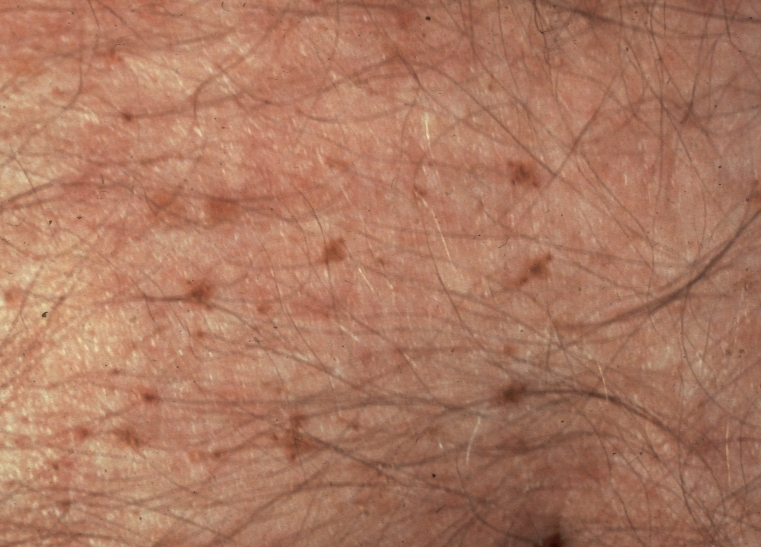
Pubic lice on the abdomen

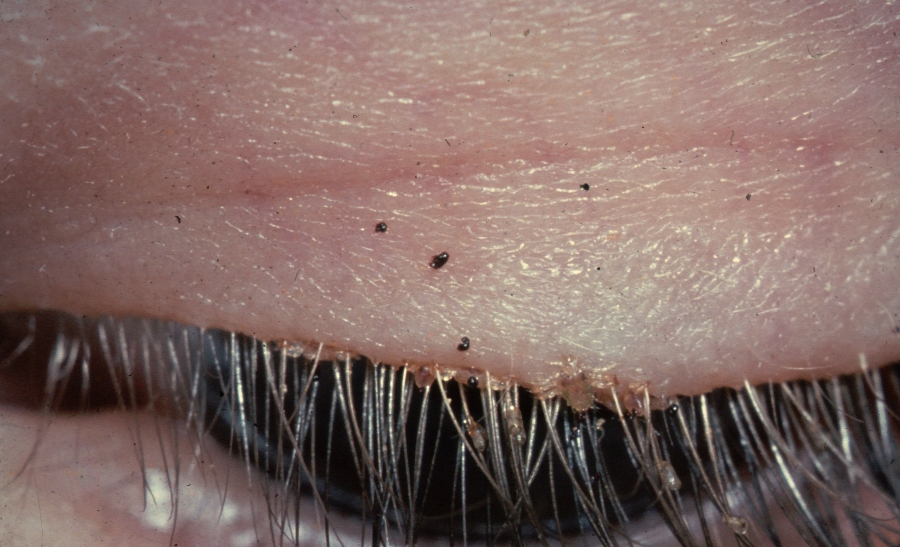
Pubic lice on the eyelashes

=== Complications ===
Complications are usually as a result of persistent scratching and include thickening of the skin, darkened skin, and secondary bacterial infection including impetigo, conjunctivitis and blepharitis.

== Causes ==
=== Spread ===
Pubic lice are usually transmitted from one person to another during vaginal, oral, anal or manual sex, whether a condom is used or not. One sexual encounter with an infected person carries a high risk of catching pubic lice. In some circumstances transmission can occur through kissing and hugging, and less likely via bedding, clothing and towels. The lice spread more easily in crowded conditions where the distance between people is close, allowing the lice to crawl from one person to another.

Infestation on the eyebrows or eyelashes of a child may indicate sexual exposure or abuse.

=== Characteristics and life cycle ===
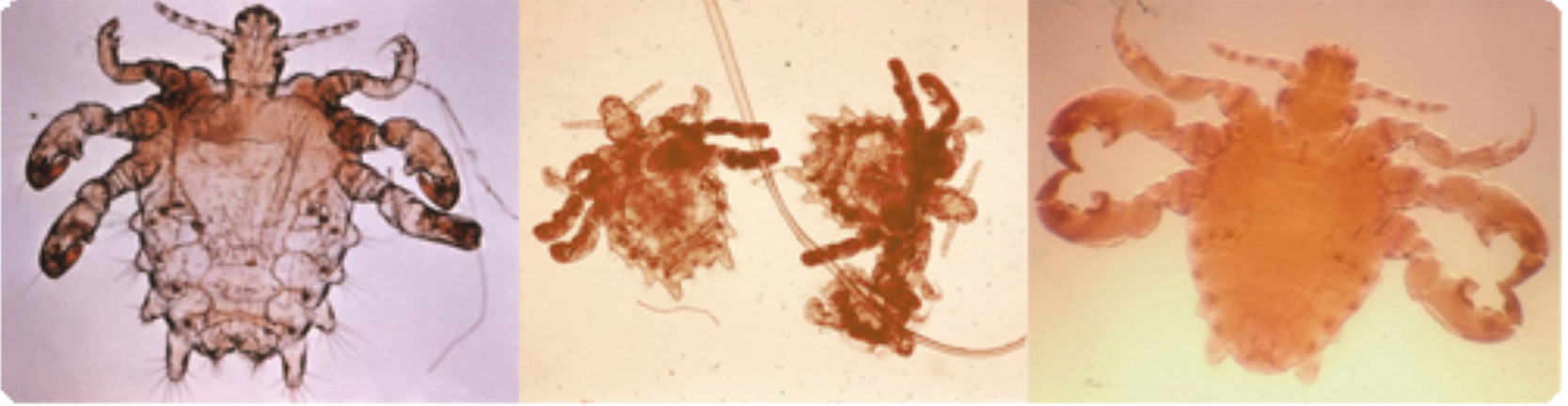
Crab lice

Pubic lice (Pthirus pubis) have three stages: the egg (also called a nit), the nymph, and the adult. They can be hard to see and are found firmly attached to the hair shaft. They are oval and usually yellow to white. Pubic lice nits take about 6–10 days to hatch. The nymph is an immature louse that hatches from the nit (egg). A nymph looks like an adult pubic louse but it is smaller. Pubic lice nymphs take about 2–3 weeks after hatching to mature into adults capable of reproducing. To live, a nymph must feed on blood. The adult pubic louse resembles a miniature crab when viewed through a strong magnifying glass. Pubic lice have six legs; their four rear legs are very large and are reminiscent of the pincher claws of a crab—thus the nickname "crabs". Pubic lice are tan to grayish-white in color. Females lay nits and are usually larger than males. To live, lice must feed on blood. If the louse falls off a person, it dies within 1–2 days. Eggs (nits) are laid on a hair shaft. Females will lay approximately 30 eggs during their 3–4 week life span. Eggs hatch after about a week and become nymphs, which look like smaller versions of the adults. The nymphs undergo three molts before becoming adults. Adults are 1.5–2.0 mm long and flattened. They are much broader in comparison to head and body lice. Adults are found only on the human host and require human blood to survive. Pubic lice are transmitted from person to person most-commonly via sexual contact, although fomites (bedding, clothing) may play a minor role in their transmission.

== Diagnosis ==
Diagnosis is made by carefully looking at the pubic hair for nits, young lice and adult lice. Lice and nits can be removed either with forceps or by cutting the infested hair with scissors (with the exception of an infestation of the eye area). A magnifying glass, dermatoscope or a stereo-microscope can be used for identification. Testing for other sexually transmitted infections is recommended in those who are infested with pubic lice.

=== Definition ===
Pediculosis pubis is an infestation by the pubic louse, Pthirus pubis, a wingless insect which feeds on blood and lays its eggs (nits) on mainly pubic hair. Less commonly, hair near the anus, armpit, beard, eyebrows, moustache, and eyelashes may be involved. Although the presence of pubic lice is associated with the presence of other sexually transmitted diseases, pubic lice are not known to spread infectious diseases.

== Treatment ==
Pubic lice can be treated at home. Available treatments may vary from country to country and include mainly permethrin-containing creams and lotions applied to cool dry skin or applying dimethicone-based oils.

Treatment with medication is combined with combing pubic hair with a fine-toothed comb after applying vinegar directly to skin or dipping the comb in vinegar, to remove nits. It is recommended to wash bedding, clothing and towels in hot water or preferably in a washing machine at 50°C or higher. When this is not possible, the clothing can be stored in a sealed plastic bag for at least three days. Re-infestation can be prevented by wearing clean underwear at the start of treatment and after completing treatment. Shaving the affected hair is not essential.

=== First line ===
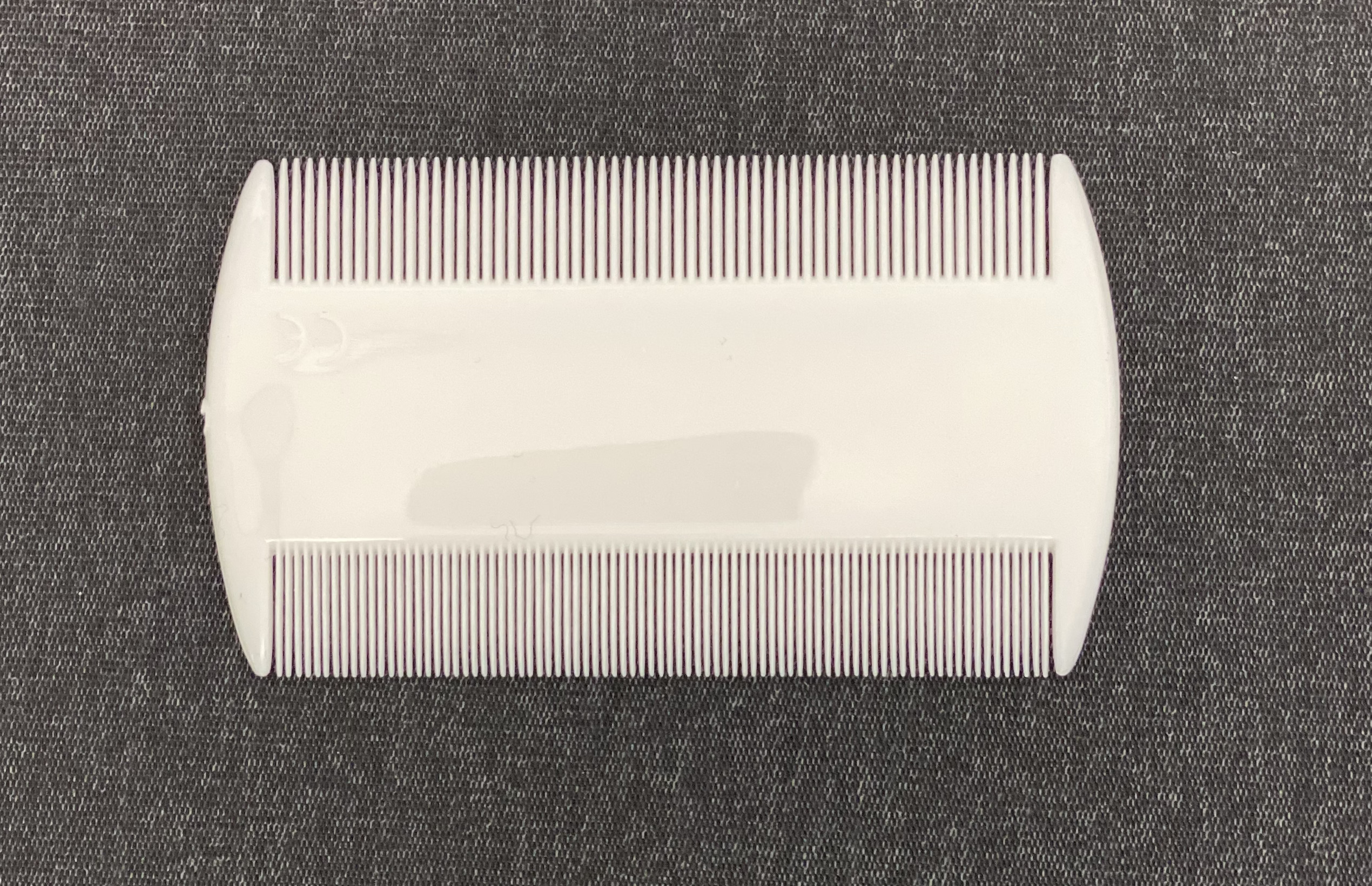
Nit comb

At first, treatment is usually with topical permethrin 1% cream, which can be bought over the counter without a prescription. It is applied to the areas affected by pubic lice and washed off after 10 minutes. Brands of permethrin include 'Lyclear', available in the UK as a creme rinse or dermal cream at 5% strengths. In the US, common permethrin brands include NIX, Actin and Elimite.

An alternative is the combination of pyrethrins and piperonyl butoxide, in a topical application, which include the brands Licide, and A-200, Pronto and RID shampoos. These medications are safe and effective when used exactly according to the instructions in the package or on the label. To kill newly hatched lice, both treatments can be repeated within the following seven to ten days.

European guidelines state alternatives to permethrin as including either the application of 0.2% phenothrin (washed off after two hours), or 0.5% malathion lotions (washed off after 12 hours). The CDC states alternatives as topical 0.5% malathion or oral ivermectin.

=== Other treatments ===
Lindane is still used in a shampoo form in some non-European countries. Its licence was withdrawn by the European Medicines Agency in 2008. It may be considered as a last resort in some people who show resistance to other treatments, but is not recommended to be used for a second round of treatment. Lindane is not recommended in pregnant and breastfeeding women, children under the age of two years, and people who have extensive dermatitis. The FDA warns against use in people with a history of uncontrolled seizure disorders and cautious use in infants, children, the elderly, and individuals with other skin conditions (e.g., atopic dermatitis, psoriasis) and in those who weigh less than 110 lbs (50 kg). Carbaryl has been used since 1976 but found to have the potential to cause cancer in rodents and to be not as effective as previously thought. It is either not used at all or its use is restricted.

Sexual partners should be evaluated and treated, and sexual contact should be avoided until all partners are completely free of any eggs, nymphs or adult lice. Because of the strong association between the presence of pubic lice and sexually transmitted infections (STIs), affected people require investigation for other STIs.

=== Eyes ===
Infestation of the eyes is treated differently from other parts of the body. Lice can be removed with forceps or by removing or trimming the lashes. Eyelashes may be treated with a gentle petroleum jelly for occlusion.

== Epidemiology ==
Infestation with pubic lice is found in all parts of the world, occurs in all ethnic groups and all levels of society.

Current worldwide prevalence has been very approximately estimated at two percent of the human population. Accurate numbers are difficult to acquire, because pubic lice infestations are not considered a reportable condition by many governments. Many cases are self-treated or treated discreetly by personal physicians, which further adds to the difficulty of producing accurate statistics.

It has been reported that the trend of pubic hair removal has led to the destruction of the natural habitat of the crab louse populations in some parts of the world, thereby reducing the incidence of the disease.

== Etymology ==
Infestation with pubic lice is also called phthiriasis or phthiriasis pubis, while infestation of eyelashes with pubic lice is called phthiriasis palpebrarum or pediculosis ciliarum. Linnaeus was first to describe and name the pubic louse in 1758, when he called it Pediculus pubis. The disease is spelled with phth, but the scientific name of the louse Pthirus pubis is spelled with pth (an etymologically incorrect spelling that was nonetheless officially adopted in 1958).

== Other animals ==
Humans are the only known hosts of this parasite, although a closely related species, Pthirus gorillae, infects gorilla populations. Early humans may have encountered the parasite while sleeping in quarters vacated by gorillas or by eating gorilla carcasses.

== In popular culture ==
"Pediculis [sic] pubis" is a crude song by the Yugoslav rock band Bijelo Dugme recorded in 1984 as part of their self-titled album Bijelo Dugme.
