= Oil waxing =

Oil waxing occurs when heating oil begins to gel, and before it has become too viscous to flow at all in the heating system oil piping, wax particles (wax platelets or little spheres of wax or in some articles, alkane "wax crystals") have already begun to form in the fuel. The wax platelets form first from the long hydrocarbon chains which are a component in the heating oil (or diesel fuel). It is these waxy particles that can clog an oil line or even an oil-fired heating boiler, furnace, or water heater.
