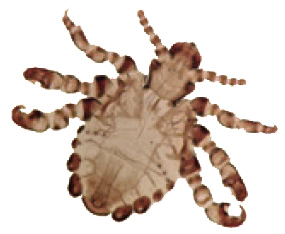
- A magnified image of Pthirus gorillae

Scientific classification
- Domain: Eukaryota
- Kingdom: Animalia
- Phylum: Arthropoda
- Class: Insecta
- Order: Psocodea
- Family: Pthiridae
- Genus: Pthirus
- Species: P. gorillae

Binomial name
- Pthirus gorillae Ewing, 1927

= Pthirus gorillae =

Species of louse

Pthirus gorillae or gorilla louse is a species of parasitic sucking louse that afflicts gorillas. It is found in the African continent, specifically in Rwanda and Democratic Republic of the Congo. P. gorillae and P. pubis (the crab louse) are the only known species that belong to the genus Pthirus, often incorrectly spelled as Phthirus (the Greek word for louse is phthir). It is suggested that it is transmitted among its hosts by social grooming, shared bedding and sexual contact.

All species of sucking lice feed on blood. They live in close association with their hosts and complete their entire life cycle on the host. Pthirus gorillae infests the same parts of the bodies of gorillas as Pthirus pubis does in humans, but since the gorilla is hairier, the lice tend to range over the whole body. The two also resemble each other with the exception that Pthirus gorillae has large eyes that are placed on large lateral protuberances. A short and broad sucking louse, it is about 2.20 mm long with sprawling legs and not more than 20 small abdominal setae.

It was first identified from specimens of mountain gorillas in 1927 by Henry Ellsworth Ewing during a game-hunting trip in what is now the Democratic Republic of the Congo. Molecular phylogenetics suggest that P. gorillae jumped from gorillas to early humans 3.3 million years ago and diverged into the present-day pubic louse. Researchers theorize that humans acquired the parasite while butchering or scavenging on gorilla carcasses, or sleeping in the abandoned sleeping nests of gorillas.

Several lice of the species were found during a necropsy in the stomach of a female gorilla from Bwindi Impenetrable National Park; she had presumably been grooming before she died.

The conservation status of this species is unknown. Since its host species is critically endangered, it is likely that this species is endangered too.
