= Male waxing =

Practice of male pubic hair removal

Male waxing is the broad term for hair removal for men using depilatory wax; it is also called "male body waxing" and "male Brazilian waxing". The latter refers to the removal of hair from the pubic area and buttocks.

== Male body waxing ==
Male body waxing refers to all body areas from neck to toe except the genital and buttocks area. Normal body hair is finer with shallower roots than pubic hair. It is usually removed with strip wax which leaves a smooth result and exfoliates the top layer of dead skin cells.

== Male Brazilian waxing ==
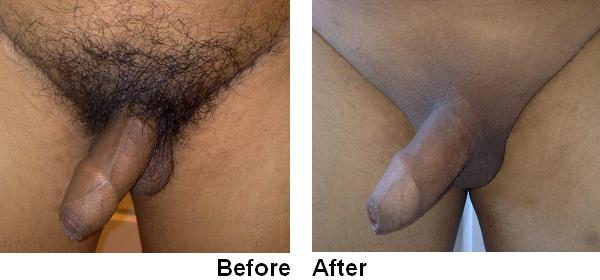
Male Brazilian

The somewhat vague term male Brazilian waxing, refers to any removal of hair from the pubis, penis, scrotum, perineum, or buttocks. The definition also usually includes the bikini line, or an inch or two out from the leg crease. It takes its name from female Brazilian waxing. The term Manzilian is becoming increasingly mainstream in advertising and popular culture to differentiate the treatment from female waxing.

Fewer female estheticians nowadays are prepared to offer Brazilian waxing to men as opposed to women, largely due to safety concerns. Many female professionals have expressed feeling unsafe, citing experiences of sexual harassment during the treatment or even just from advertising it.
