= Bikini waxing =

Removal of pubic hair using special wax

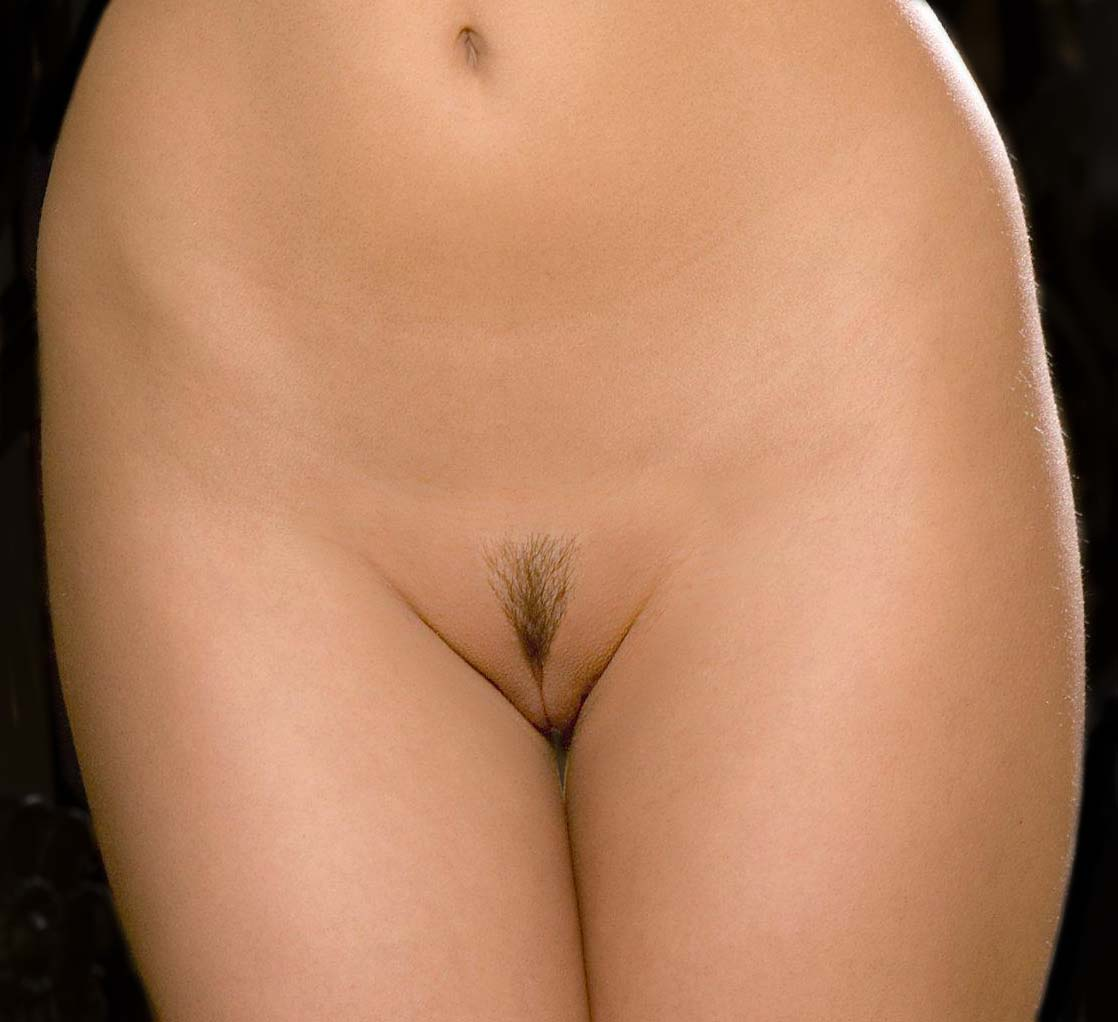
A woman's pubic area after a partial bikini wax

Bikini waxing is the removal of pubic hair using a special wax, which can be hot or cold, that adheres to hairs and pulls them out when the wax is removed quickly from the skin, usually with a cloth strip. While the practice is mainly associated with women, male waxing to remove men's pubic hair has become a more common practice.

A bikini line is the area of the upper leg and inner thigh in which pubic hair grows that is normally not covered by the bottom part of a swimsuit. In some cultures, visible pubic hair in this region is disliked and/or considered embarrassing and so it is sometimes removed. However, some people remove pubic hair that will not be exposed for aesthetics, personal grooming, hygiene, culture, religion, fashion and for sexual intercourse.

== Technique ==
Pubic hair can be removed in a number of ways, such as waxing, shaving, sugaring, electrolysis, laser hair removal or with chemical depilatory creams. Waxing involves applying melted, usually hot, wax to the pubic hair that an individual would like to remove. The wax, which adheres to the hair as it hardens, is then covered with small strips of cloth. When the wax hardens sufficiently, the cloth is pulled off quickly, removing the hair from its roots as the wax is pulled away. Waxing can be performed on oneself privately using a home kit or by a cosmetologist at a salon or spa.

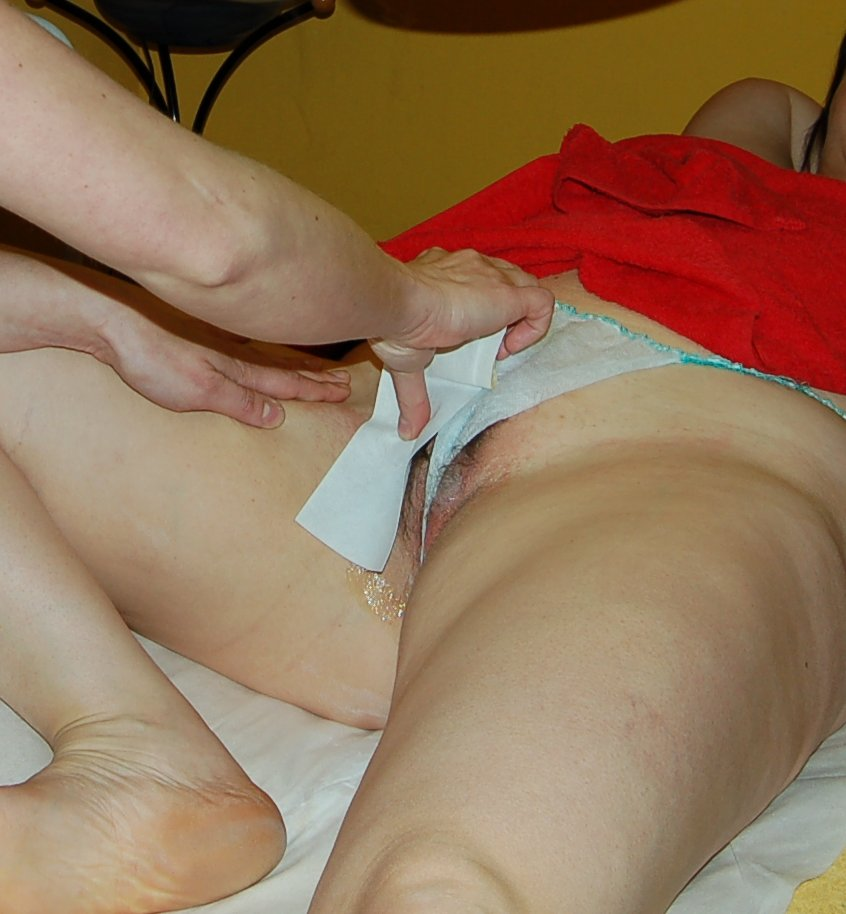
Wax being applied to female pubic hair

If a person has never been waxed before, or has not been waxed for a long time, it may be necessary to trim the pubic hair using scissors or an electric razor prior to waxing. A patch test is recommended, usually on the upper thigh, to test for allergies or skin sensitivities to the ingredients in the wax. Sometimes a hair growth inhibitor is applied after waxing, which slows the regrowth of hair if applied daily for an extended period of time.

It is common to apply an antiseptic cleaner and powder to the area prior to waxing. Wax is applied with a spatula in the direction of hair growth the size of a strip about 2 inches (5.1 cm) wide and 4 inches (10 cm) long. When the wax is set but still pliable, the wax strips are pulled away against the direction of hair growth while keeping the skin taut. The strip is ideally pulled off as swiftly as possible.

The pubic area is one of the most sensitive areas in the body and during the procedure special attention must be paid to avoid irritation. Pain directly resulting from the procedure can be slight or severe and can continue from several seconds to several minutes. Some people experience less pain during subsequent treatments. It can be helpful to take a mild anti-inflammatory medication (such as ibuprofen) an hour or so before waxing to reduce potential pain from the waxing. Products such as topical anesthetics are available to lessen the pain involved. A bikini wax during pregnancy is generally more painful, due to increased sensitivity. The type of wax used for bikini lines is often made from a mixture of beeswax and tall oil rather than the more common synthetic waxes used for waxing regular leg hair. Beeswax is considered stronger and more effective at removing the thicker and coarser pubic hair.

Sometimes bumps or in-grown hair can result from waxing. Isolated hairs can be removed with tweezers or electrolysis. Discomfort following the procedure generally lasts two to five days or less. Application of egg oil for a few days post-waxing can help moisturize the skin and reduce inflammation, pain or growth of bacteria. With repeated removal over time, pubic hair becomes weaker and grows more slowly, leading to easier removal with less pain and less frequent waxing.

== Styles ==
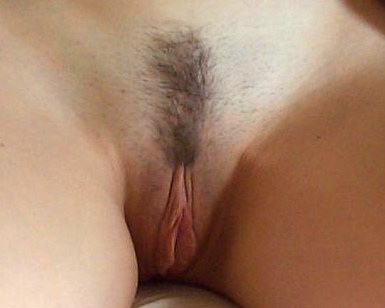
French waxing: Hair is removed entirely except a rectangular "landing strip".

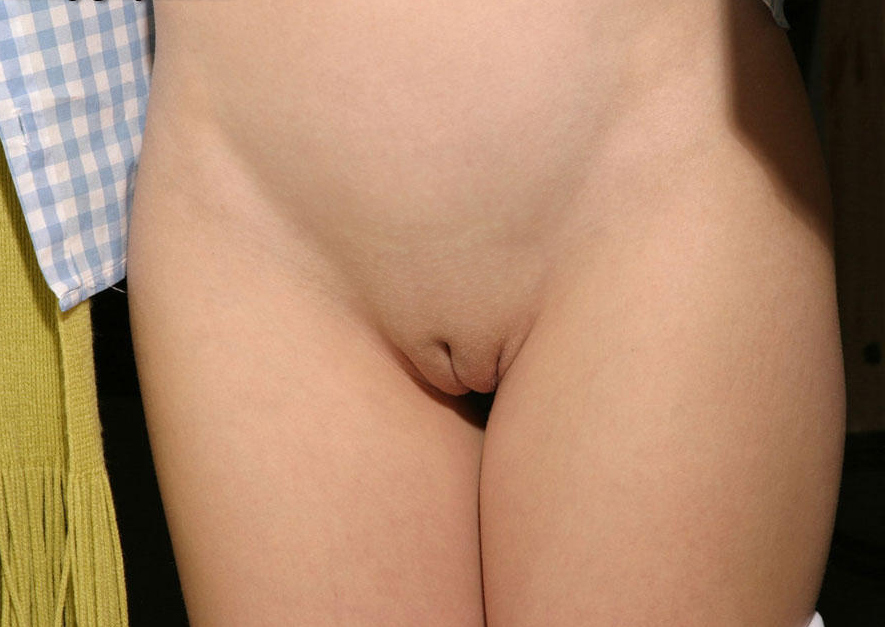
Brazilian waxing: All hair is removed. In some places the technique is called Hollywood waxing.

Some people modify their pubic hair either to fit in with societal trends or simply as an expression of their own style or lifestyle, while others object to any styling or do not practice it because of cost considerations.

"Natural" (also known as "au natural" or "bush") refers to pubic hair that has not been removed, trimmed or styled at all. "Trimmed" or "cut" refers to pubic hair that has been shortened, but not completely removed other than shaving the inner thighs. Some women trim, but keep hair on their labia, while removing the pubic hair on the mons pubis. Pubic hair may be styled into several basic styles which are often referred to by different names. Salons often use their own unique names for common types of waxing, for example referring to a Brazilian with a "landing strip" as a "Mohican" or a "Hollywood" as "Full Monty".

The three major types are described below:

=== American waxing ===
American waxing is the removal of only the pubic hair that would not be covered by a swimsuit. For a bikini, it would be hair at the top of the thighs and under the navel. It is also known as a "basic bikini wax", "triangle", or "bikini line", as it involves waxing hair from the sides to form a triangle so that pubic hair cannot be seen while wearing a swimsuit. Bikini bottoms or underwear are usually worn while getting an American wax. A normal American waxing job takes about 20 to 30 minutes to complete.

=== French waxing ===
French waxing (sometimes called a landing strip or a partial Brazilian wax) leaves a vertical strip of pubic hair about 1.5 inches (3.8 cm) wide and 3 inches (7.6 cm) long just above the vulva. Hair around the anus area and labia may be removed. To create the "landing strip" (a line of hair) practitioners and clients prefer either lying face up or lying face down. Sometimes hard wax is used, though strip wax works as effectively.

=== Brazilian waxing ===
Brazilian waxing is the removal of all pubic hair from the pelvic region, labia, perineum, and anus, while sometimes leaving a thin strip of hair on the mons pubis. It can be used by those who wear thong bikinis. Brazilian waxing is also known as a full Brazilian wax, full bikini wax, or the Hollywood wax. This style was first called the Brazilian wax by the J. Sisters salon in Manhattan, founded in 1987 by seven sisters named Padilha from Brazil.

Brazilian waxing is more controversial than other types of waxing. Like all waxing, it can be painful. Some believe it is more unpleasant to receive cunnilingus from a bearded partner after getting a Brazilian wax. Some critics of the procedure believe that Brazilian waxing can contribute to making an adult woman look underage, claiming that this may be one reason for its popularity in the sex industry. There is also a health risk involved if it is not done properly, as well as a risk of infection if done on a person with a weakened immune system.

== Health ==
In 2016, the Journal of the American Medical Association published a study in which it was found that out of 3,316 American women surveyed, 84% reported a history of lifetime pubic hair grooming, with 59% reporting that the primary motivations for grooming were for hygienic purposes.

Bikini waxing has been credited with a significant global reduction in cases of pubic lice. However, the medical community has also seen a recent increase in folliculitis, or infection around the hair follicle, in women who wax or shave their bikini areas.

== Social attitudes ==
In Islam, the removal of unwanted body hair is known as an act of fitra. In India, ethnologist F. Fawcett, writing in 1901, had observed the removal of body hair, including pubic hair about the vulva, as a custom of women from the Hindu caste group known as Nair. In Western societies, removal of female body hair (except for head hair, eyelashes and eyebrows) has traditionally been considered appropriate when it was visible.

The styling of pubic hair has become more fashionable as the coverage of swimwear has decreased, following innovations such as the introduction of the bikini in 1946 and the removal of skirts from swimsuits. Changes in lingerie styles also encouraged the removal of pubic hair, and the nude crotch‍—‌i.e., the total removal of pubic hair, such as in a full Brazilian‍—‌became considered by many to be erotic and glamorous. A nude crotch is considered by some to be more youthful looking. According to Tschachler, Devine and Draxlbauer, removal of all visible body hair has come to be seen as an important aspect of femininity.

== See also ==
- Anal bleaching
- Genital piercing
- Hair removal
- Merkin
- Vajazzle
