= Certified Professional Electrologist =

Certified Professional Electrologist (CPE) credential signifies that an electrologist's knowledge has been tested and measured against a national standard of excellence. The credential was developed and is administered through the American Electrology Association's International Board of Electrologist Certification (IBEC). The CPE must obtain seventy-five hours of continuing education, in a five-year period, to maintain this voluntary credential, or be re-tested.
