= Pubic hair =

Body hair in the genital region

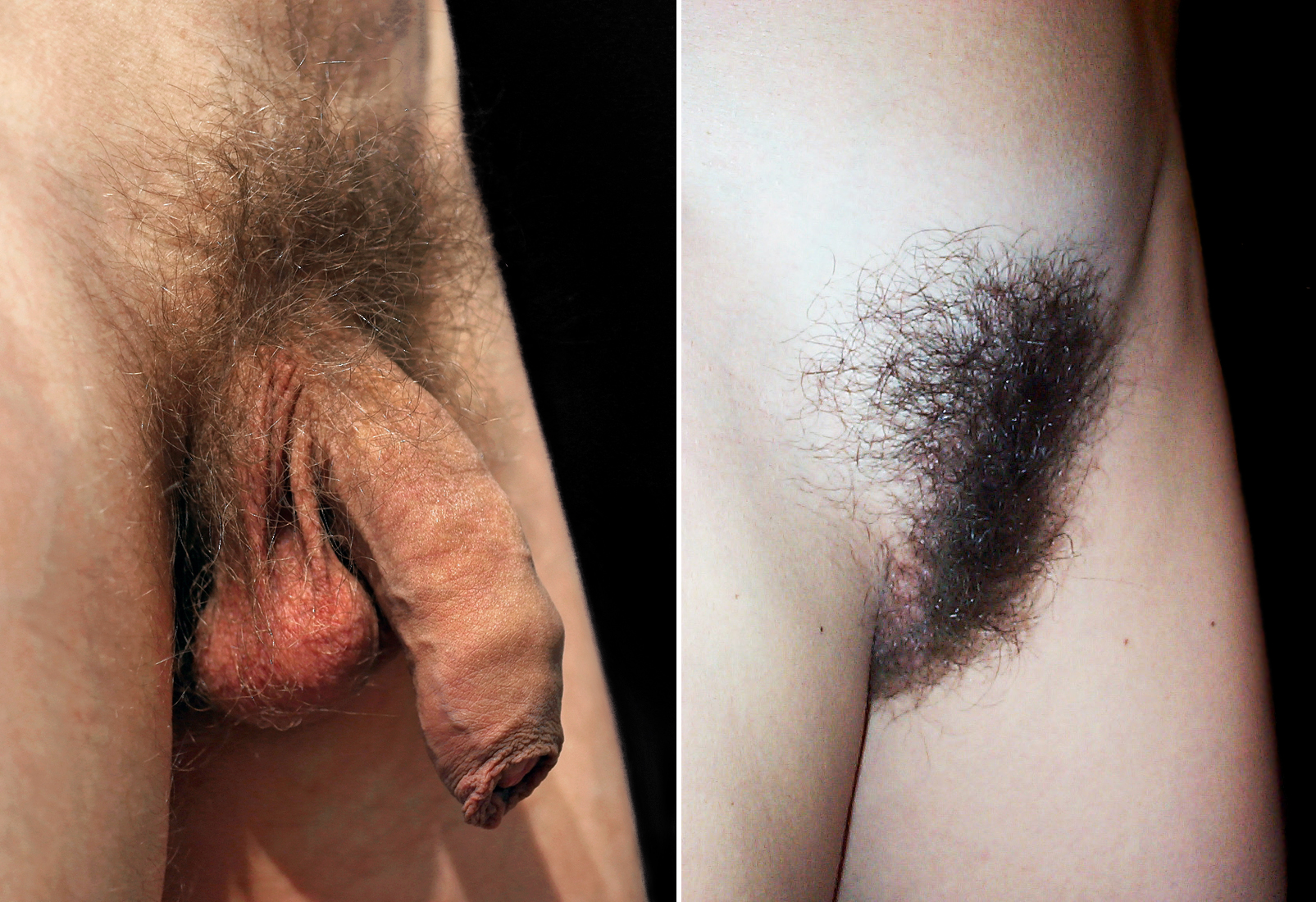
- Pubic hair of male and female

Details

Identifiers
- Latin: pubes
- TA98: A16.0.00.022
- TA2: 7062
- FMA: 54319 70754, 54319

Pubic hair (or pubes (Note: /ˈpjuːbiːz/, /ˈpjuːbiːz/)) is terminal body hair that is found in the genital area and pubic region of adolescent and adult humans. The hair is located on and around the sex organs, and sometimes at the top of the inside of the thighs, even extending down the perineum, and to the anal region. Pubic hair is also found on the scrotum and base of the penile shaft (in males) and on the vulva (in females). Around the pubis bone and the mons pubis that covers it, it is known as a pubic patch, which can be styled.

Although fine vellus hair is present in the area during childhood, pubic hair is considered to be the heavier, longer, coarser hair that develops during puberty as an effect of rising levels of hormones: androgens in males and estrogens in females.

Many cultures regard pubic hair as erotic, and most cultures associate it with the genitals, which people are expected to keep covered at all times. In some cultures, it is the norm for pubic hair to be removed, especially of females; the practice is regarded as part of personal hygiene. In some cultures, the exposure of pubic hair (for example, when one is wearing a swimsuit), particularly in public, is regarded as disgraceful and may be embarrassing, and so the hair may be trimmed (or otherwise styled) to prevent its being visible.

== Development ==
Tanner scale – female

Pubic hair forms in response to the increasing levels of testosterone in both girls and boys. Those hair follicles that are located and stimulated in androgen sensitive areas develop pubic hair. The Tanner scale describes and quantifies the development of pubic hair. Before the onset of puberty, the genital area of both boys and girls has very fine vellus hair (stage 1). At the onset of puberty, the body produces rising levels of the sex hormones, and in response, the skin of the genital area begins to produce thicker and rougher, often curlier, hair with a faster growth rate. The onset of pubic hair development is termed pubarche.

In females, pubarche is usually the second sign of puberty after thelarche, though sometimes it happens before thelarche.

In males, the first pubic hair appears as a few sparse hairs that are usually thin on the scrotum or at the upper base of the penis (stage 2). Within a year, hairs around the base of the penis are abundant (stage 3). Within 3 to 4 years, hair fills the pubic area (stage 4) and becomes much thicker and darker, and by 5 years extends to the near thighs and upwards on the abdomen toward the umbilicus (stage 5).

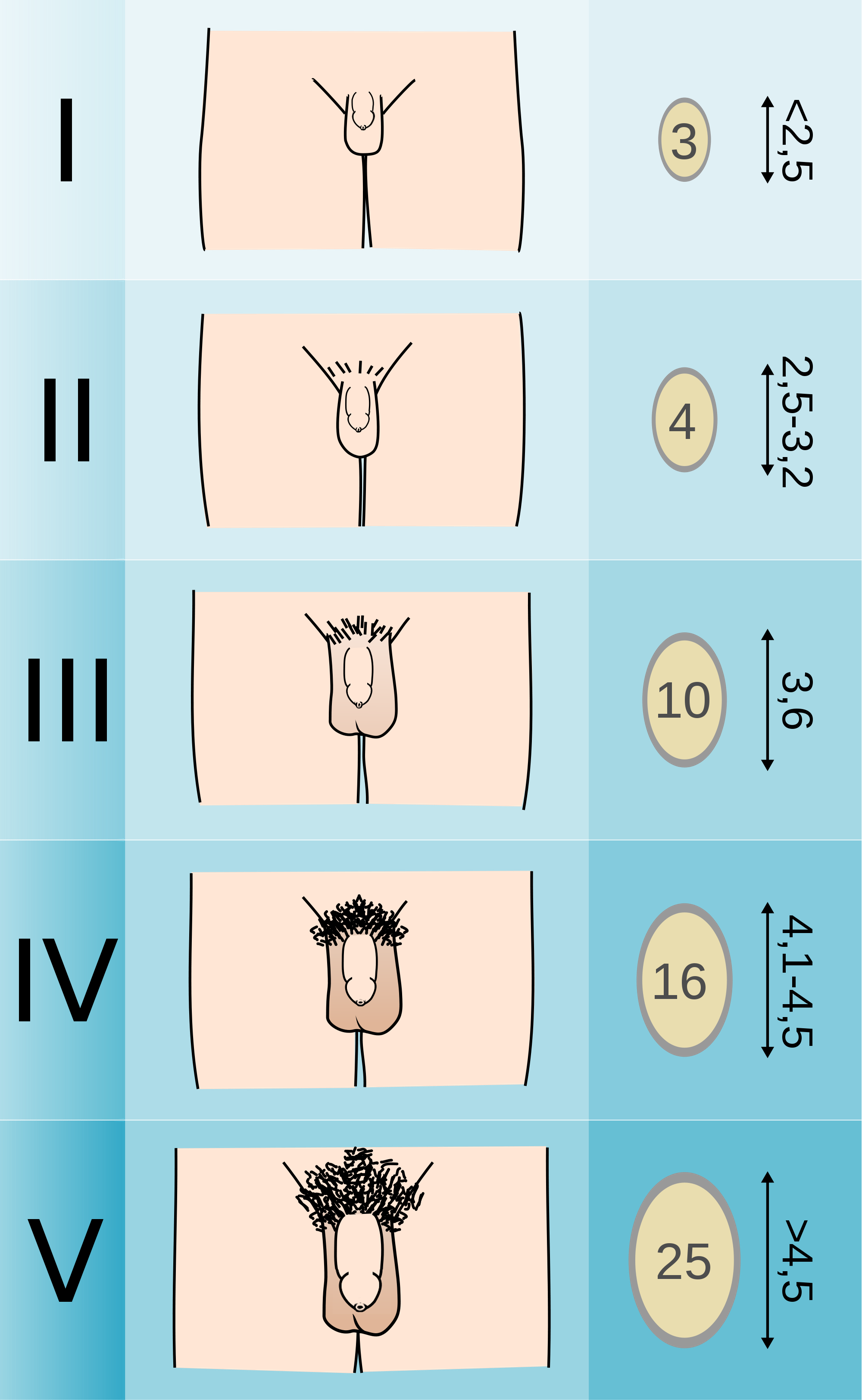
Tanner scale – male

Other areas of the skin are similarly, though slightly less, sensitive to androgens and androgenic hair typically appears somewhat later. In rough sequence of sensitivity to androgens and appearance of androgenic hair are the armpits (axillae), perianal area, upper lip, preauricular areas (sideburns), periareolar areas (nipples), middle of the chest, neck under the chin, remainder of chest and beard area, limbs and shoulders, back, and buttocks. Although generally considered part of the process of puberty, pubarche is distinct and independent of the process of maturation of the gonads that leads to sexual maturation and fertility. Pubic hair can develop from adrenal androgens alone and can develop even when the ovaries or testes are defective and nonfunctional. There is little, if any, difference in the capacity of male and female bodies to grow hair in response to androgens.

Pubic hair and underarm hair can vary in color considerably from the hair of the scalp. In most people, it is darker, although it can also be lighter. In most cases it is most similar in color to a person's eyebrows.

Hair texture varies from tightly curled to entirely straight, not necessarily correlating to the texture of the scalp hair. People of East Asian heritage tend to have black, wavy pubic hair.

Pubic hair patterns can vary by race and ethnicity. Patterns of pubic hair, known as the escutcheon, vary between both the sexes and individuals. On most females, the pubic patch is triangular and lies over the vulva and mons pubis. On many males, the pubic patch tapers upwards to a line of hair pointing towards the navel (see abdominal hair), roughly a more upward-pointing triangle. As with axillary (armpit) hair, pubic hair is associated with a concentration of sebaceous glands in the area.

== Function ==
Pubic hair differs from other hair on the body, and is a secondary sex characteristic.

Pubic hair is a defense mechanism against bugs and insects, especially in the prehistory of nakedness and clothing era.

Zoologist Desmond Morris disputes theories that it developed to signal sexual maturity or protect the skin from chafing during copulation, and prefers the explanation that pubic hair acts as a scent trap.

Also, both sexes having thick pubic hairs act as a partial cushion during intercourse.

== Clinical significance ==
=== Pubic lice ===
Pubic hair can become infested with pubic lice (also known as crab lice).

Adult pubic lice are 1.1–1.8 millimetres (0.043–0.071 in) in length. The pubic hair can usually host up to a dozen on average.

Pubic lice are usually found attached to hair in the pubic area but sometimes are found on coarse hair elsewhere on the body (for example, eyebrows, eyelashes, beard, mustache, chest, armpits, etc.). Crab lice attach to pubic hair that is thicker than other body hair because their claws are adapted to the specific diameter of pubic hair.

Pubic lice infestations (pthiriasis) are usually spread through sexual contact. The crab louse can travel up to 10 inches on the body. Pubic lice infestation is found worldwide and occurs in all races and ethnic groups and in all economic levels.

Pubic lice are usually spread through sexual contact and are most common in adults. Occasionally pubic lice may be spread by close personal contact or contact with articles such as clothing, bed linens, and towels that have been used by an infested person.

Pubic lice found on the head or eyelashes of children may be an indication of sexual exposure or abuse. Pubic lice do not transmit disease; however, secondary bacterial infection can occur from scratching of the skin. They are much broader in comparison to head and body lice. Adults are found only on the human host and require human blood to survive. If adults are forced off the host, they will die within 48 hours without a blood feeding.

Symptoms of a crab louse infection in the pubic area is intense itching, redness and inflammation. These symptoms cause increased circulation to the skin of the pubic region creating a blood-rich environment for the crab louse.

Pubic lice infestation can also be diagnosed by identifying the presence of nits or eggs on the pubic hair. In December 2016 NPR reported that "Frequent removal of pubic hair is associated with an increased risk for herpes, syphilis and human papillomavirus".

However, the medical community has also seen a recent increase in folliculitis, or infection around the hair follicle, in women who wax or shave their bikini areas. Some of these infections can develop into more serious abscesses that require incision with a scalpel, drainage of the abscess, and antibiotics.

Staphylococcus aureus is the most common cause of folliculitis. Burns can result when depilatory wax is used, even according to manufacturer instructions.

=== Grooming risks ===
Pubic hair grooming has been associated with injury and infection. It is estimated that about one quarter of the people who groom their pubic hair have had at least one lifetime injury because of the practice. Grooming has also been associated with cutaneous sexually transmitted infections, such as genital warts, syphilis, and herpes.

== Society and culture ==
According to John Ruskin's biographer Mary Lutyens, the notable author, artist, and art critic was apparently accustomed only to the hairless nudes portrayed unrealistically in art, never having seen a naked woman before his wedding night. He was allegedly so shocked by his discovery of his wife Effie's pubic hair that he rejected her, and the marriage was later legally annulled. He is supposed to have thought his wife was freakish and deformed.

Later writers have often followed Lutyens and repeated this version of events.

For example, Gene Weingarten, writing in his book I'm with Stupid (2004) states that

"Ruskin had [the marriage] annulled because he was horrified to behold upon his bride a thatch of hair, rough and wild, similar to a man's. He thought her a monster."

However, there is no proof for this, and some disagree. Peter Fuller in his book Theoria: Art and the Absence of Grace writes,

"It has been said that he was frightened on the wedding night by the sight of his wife's pubic hair; more probably, he was perturbed by her menstrual blood."

Ruskin's biographers Tim Hilton and John Batchelor also believe that menstruation is the more likely explanation.

At puberty, many girls find the sudden sprouting of pubic hair disturbing, and sometimes as unclean, because in many cases young girls have been screened by their family and by society from the sight of pubic hair. Young boys, on the other hand, tend not to be similarly disturbed by the development of their pubic hair, usually having seen body hair on their fathers.

With the reintroduction of public beaches and pools, bathing in Western Europe and the Mediterranean early in the 20th century, exposure of both sexes' areas near their pubic hair became more common, and after the progressive reduction in the size of female and male swimsuits, especially since the coming into fashion and growth in popularity of the bikini after the 1940s, the practice of shaving or bikini waxing of pubic hair off the hem lines also came into vogue.

=== Grooming practices ===
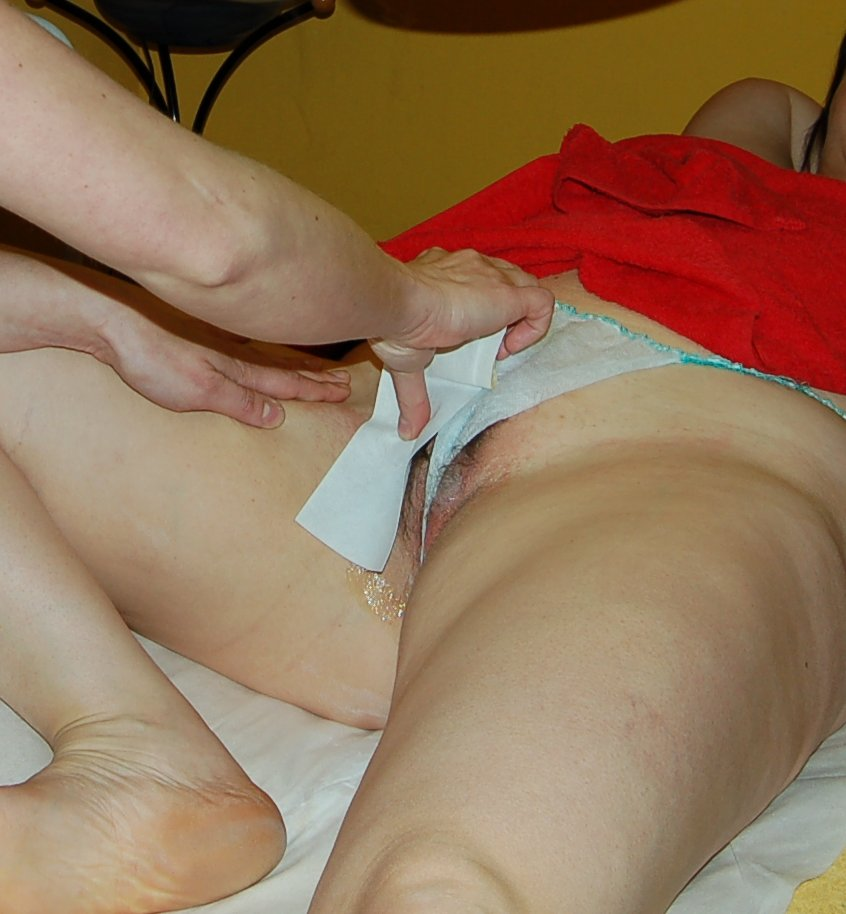
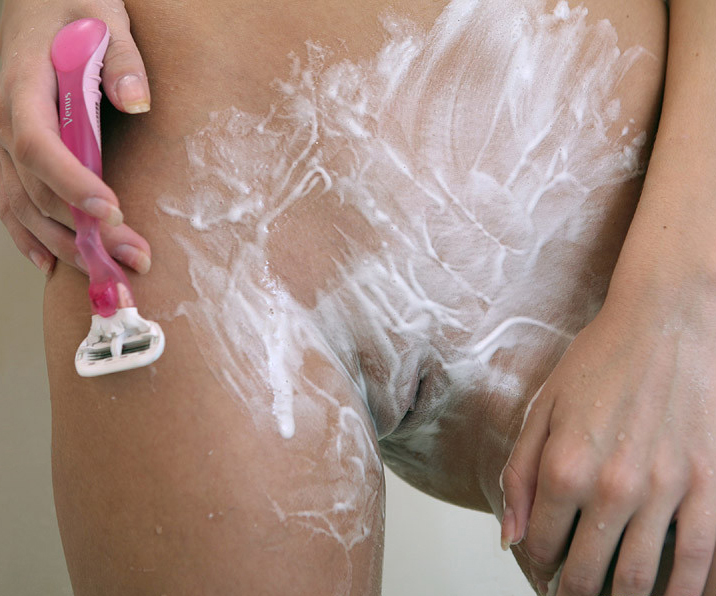
Left: Bikini waxing of woman's pubic hair. Right: Shaving of pubic area.
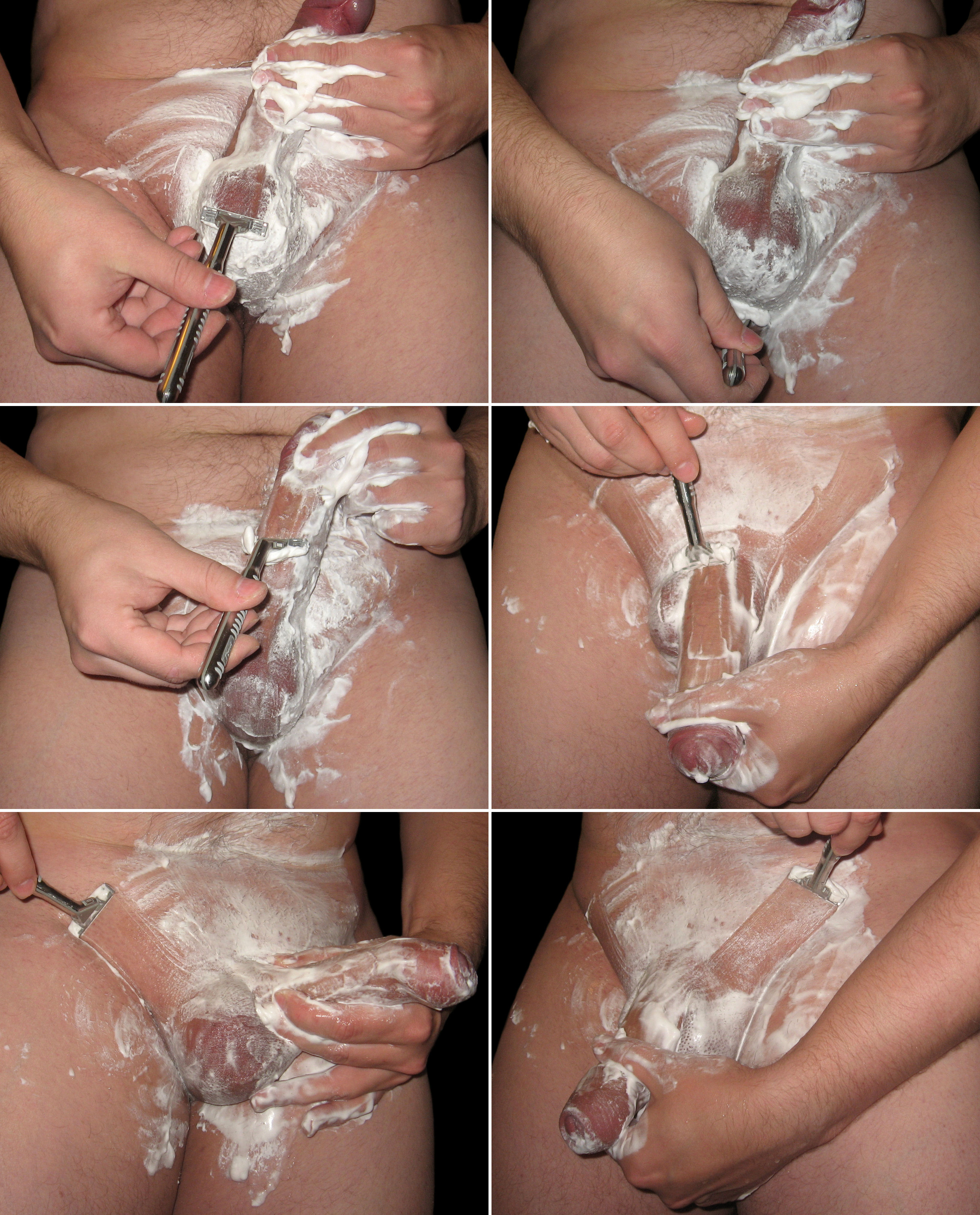
Man's pubic hair, shaving of pubic area

In some Middle Eastern societies, removal of male and female body hair has been considered proper hygiene, mandated by local customs, for many centuries. Muslim teaching (applicable to males and females) includes Islamic hygienical jurisprudence in which pubic and armpit hair must be pulled out or shaven to be considered as Sunnah. Trimming is taught to be considered acceptable.

Women working in pornography typically remove their pubic hair by shaving, a practice that became fashionable in the late 20th century. Shaving is used rather than bikini waxing because it can be performed daily, whereas waxing requires several days of growth before it can be repeated. According to feminist writer Caitlin Moran, the reason for the removal of pubic hair from women in pornography was a matter of "technical considerations of cinematography". Hair removal progressed to full removal. Because of the popularity of pornography, pubic hair shaving was mimicked by women, and it is among women outside the pornography industry that waxing became common in the late 20th and 21st century.

The presentation is regarded by some as being erotic and aesthetic, while others consider the style as unnatural. Some people remove pubic hairs for erotic and sexual reasons or because they or their sex partner enjoy the feel of a hairless crotch.

According to a 2017 academic study, as of 2016, approximately 50% of men in the United States practice regular pubic hair grooming, which can include trimming, shaving and removal. The study found that the prevalence of grooming decreases with age. Of males who groom pubic hair, 87% groom the hair above the penis, 66% groom the scrotum and 57% groom the penile shaft. A 2017 survey of 4,146 respondents aged 18-35, drawn from followers of Esquire, Cosmopolitan, and Ask Men’s social media accounts, found that 92% of respondents practiced pubic hair grooming, with 69% of men trimming and 57% of women completely removing their pubic hair.

==== Methods ====
Some individuals may remove part or all of their pubic hair, axillary hair and facial hair. The American Academy of Dermatology has a guide for safe best practices for grooming pubic hair.

Pubic hair removal using wax is called bikini waxing. The method of removing hair is called depilation (when removing only the hair above the skin) or epilation (when removing the entire hair). Beauty salons often offer various waxing services. It is sometimes referred to as "pubic topiary". Sugaring, an alternative to waxing, uses a sugar-based paste, which may include lemon, rather than wax. Sugaring removes fewer skin cells than waxing. Other methods of hair removal include laser hair removal and electrolysis.

Some women modify their pubic hair either to fit in with societal trends or as an expression of their own style or lifestyle. Many men also remove their pubic hair for reasons of cleanliness and sexual partner satisfaction. Styles of pubic hair modification include:

- Triangle or American wax (pubic hair is shortened from the sides to form a triangle so that pubic hair is hidden while wearing swimwear. The triangle can range from the very edge of the "bikini line" to up to an inch reduction on either side. Remaining hair length can be from an inch and a half to half an inch);
- Landing strip/French wax (pubic hair removed except for a strip of hair extending from the abdomen to the vulva);
- Partial Brazilian wax (pubic hair fully removed except for a small triangular strip);
- Full Brazilian wax or "sphinx" (complete removal of pubic hair); and
- Freestyle.

There are variations of the Brazilian wax in which a design is formed out of the pubic hair. Stencils for several shapes are available commercially. A controversial Gucci commercial included female pubic hair shaved into a 'G'.

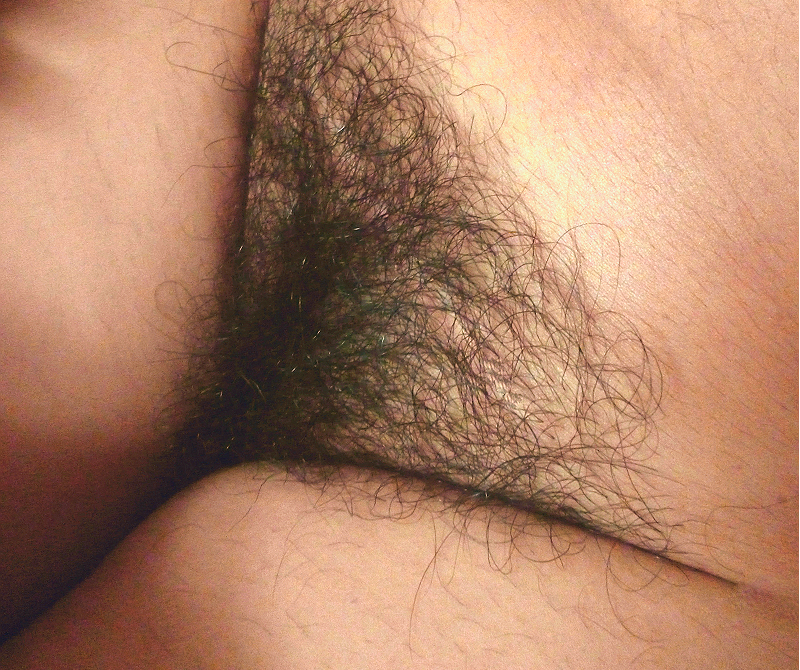
Natural or "au naturel" – no trimming and therefore no maintenance

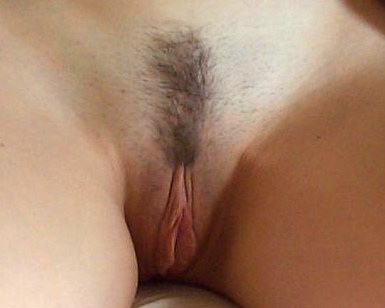
Landing strip/French wax – waxing with a "landing strip" or "metro ticket"

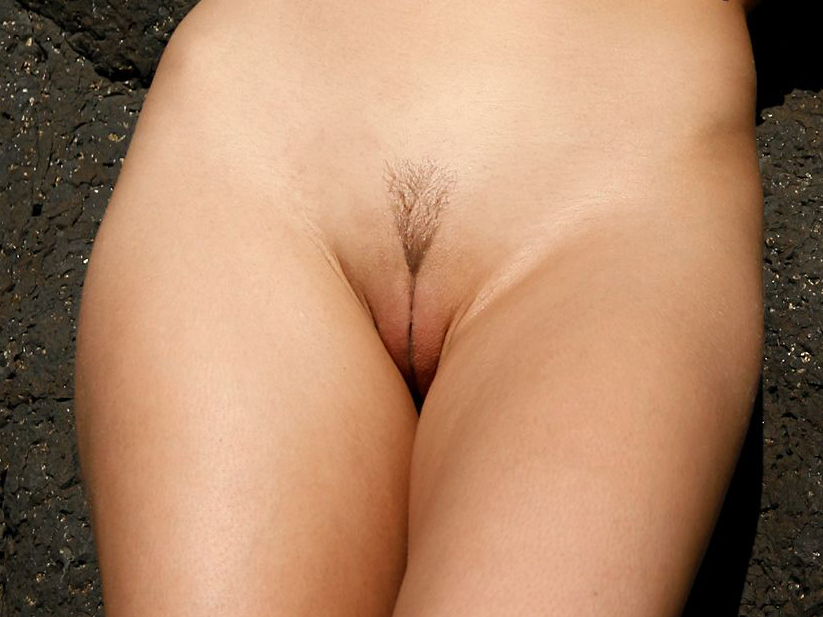
Partial "Brazilian wax" with a small triangular strip left

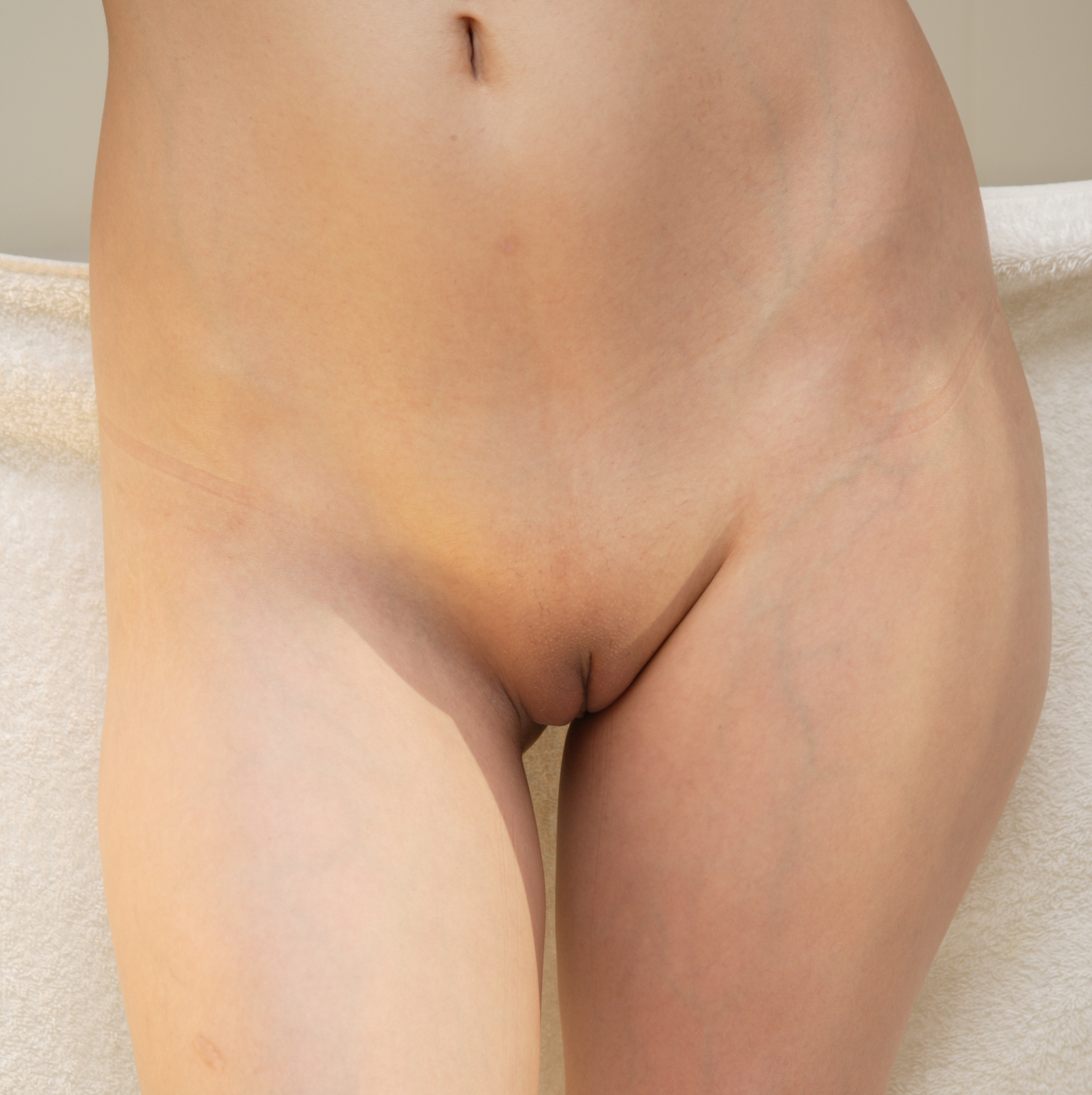
"Brazilian wax" or "Sphinx" – a full waxing; no hair at all
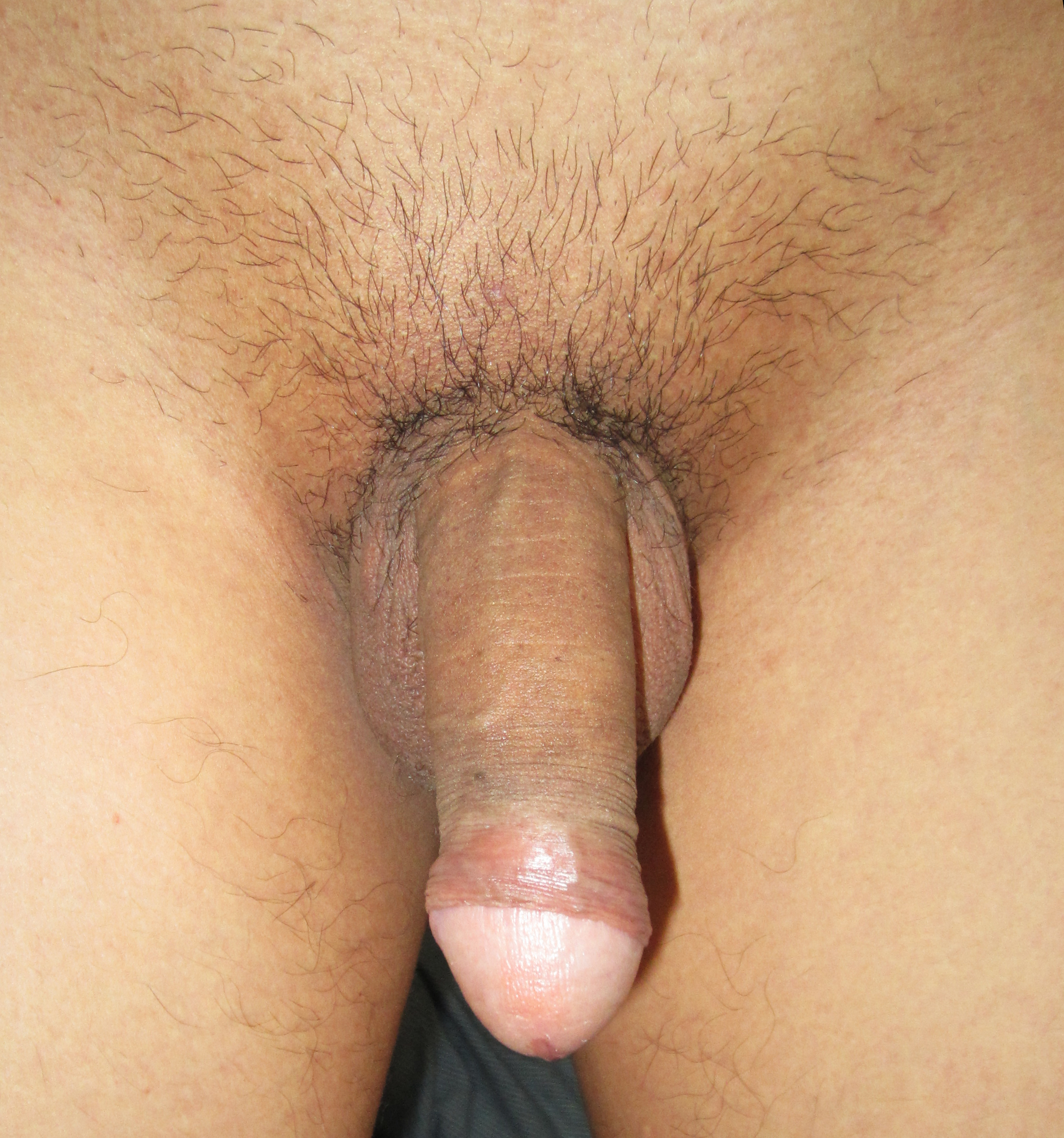
Male genitalia with trimmed pubic hair

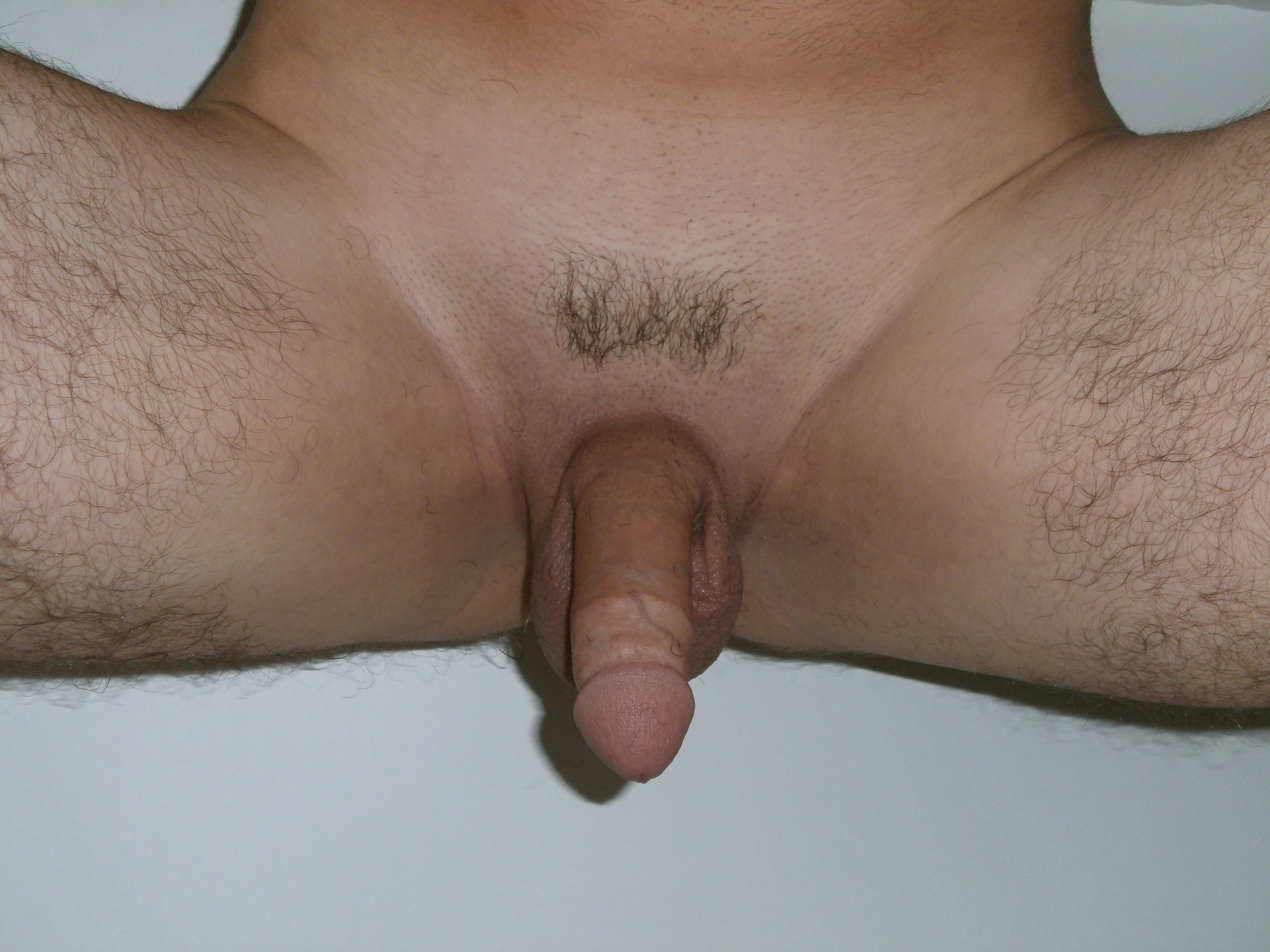
Male genitalia with partly shaved pubic hair

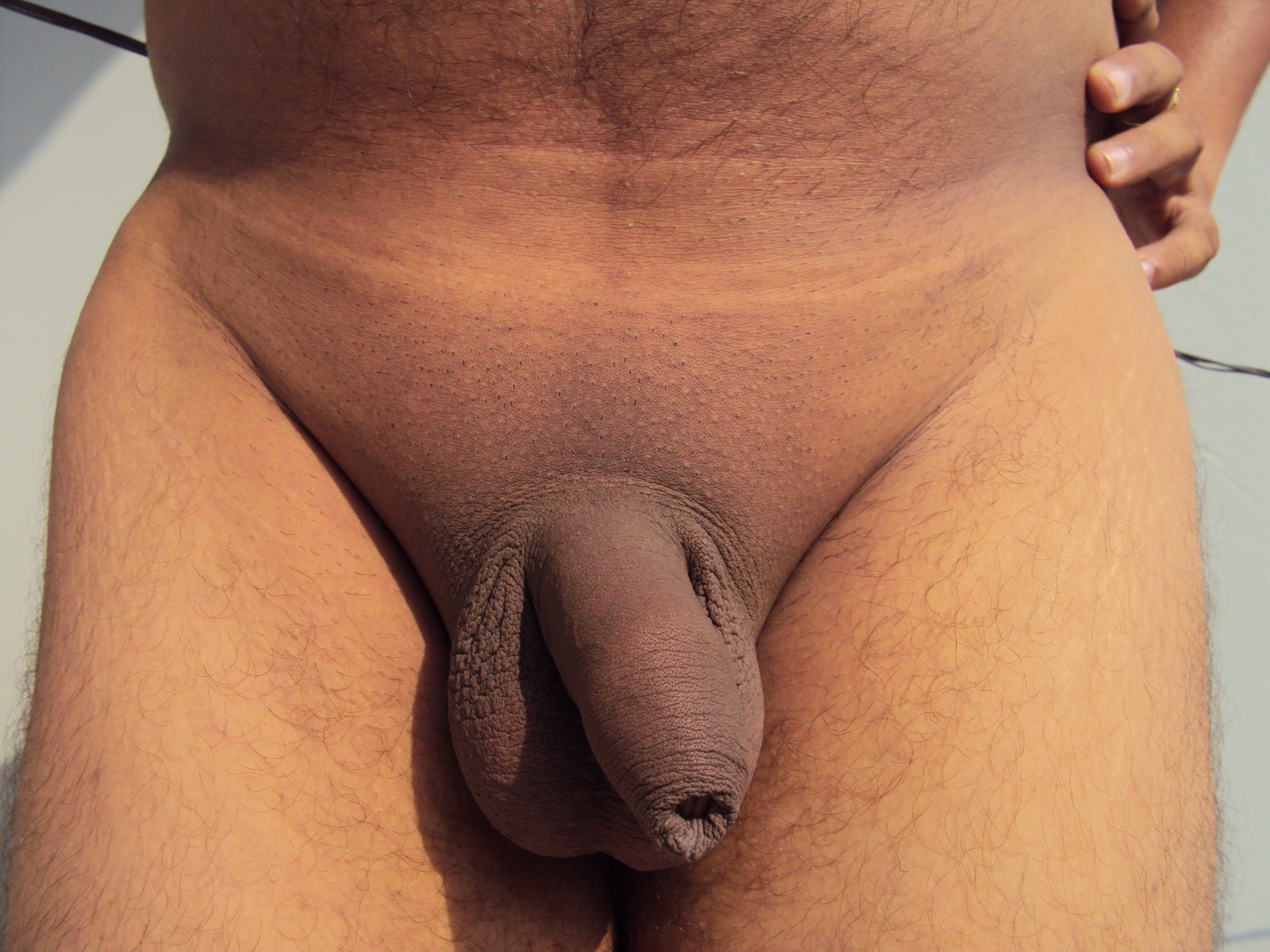
Fully shaved male genitalia

==== Sexual attraction ====
A woman or man's decision to grow or shave their pubic hair can play a role in attracting a partner. A Cosmopolitan survey found that a plurality of respondents, both male and female, preferred partners who shave or at least trim their pubic hair. A smaller percentage of 6% of men and 10% of women preferred their partners to go natural and not shave or trim their pubic hair.

=== In art ===
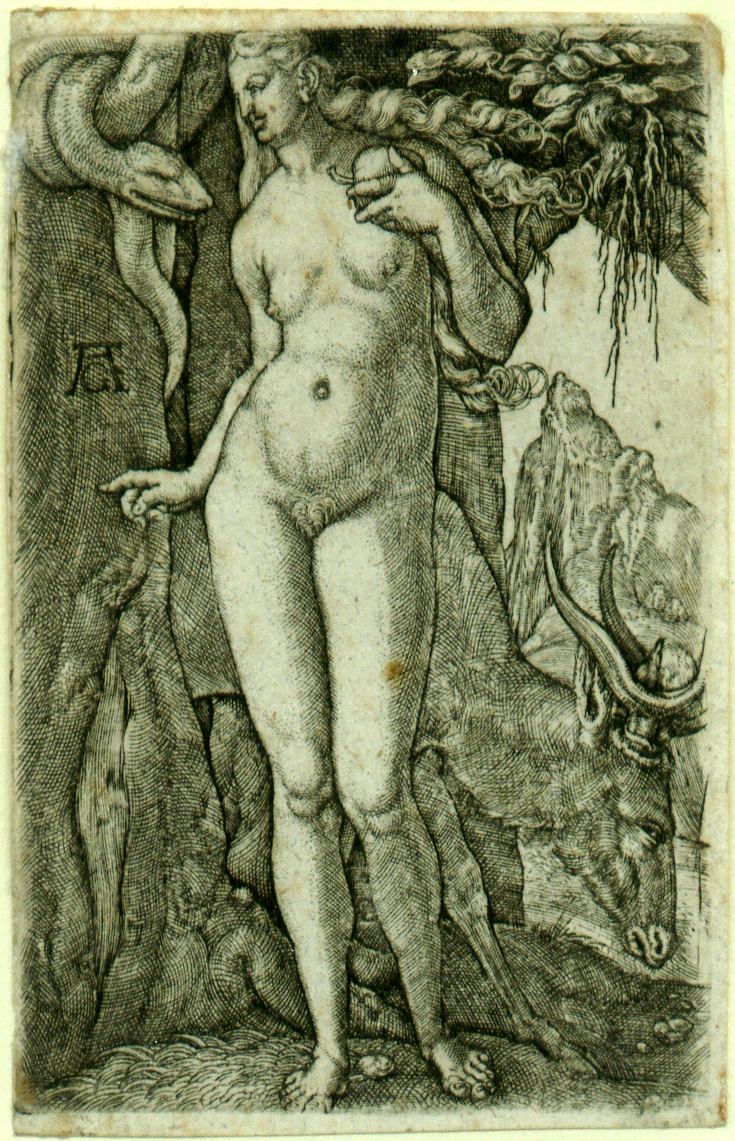
Heinrich Aldegrever's Eve, 1540; a rare early example of pubic hair in northern European art

In ancient Egyptian art, female pubic hair is indicated in the form of painted triangles. In medieval and classical European art, pubic hair was very rarely depicted, and male pubic hair was often, but not always, omitted. Sometimes it was portrayed in stylized form, as was the case with Greek graphic art.

In 16th century southern Europe, Michelangelo showed the male David with stylized pubic hair.

In the late 18th century, female pubic hair was openly portrayed in Japanese shunga (erotica), especially in the ukiyo-e tradition. Hokusai's picture The Dream of the Fisherman's Wife (1814), which depicts a woman having an erotic fantasy, is a well-known example. In Japanese drawings, such as hentai, pubic hair is often omitted, since for a long time the display of pubic hair was not legal. The interpretation of the law has since changed.

=== In fashion ===
In 1985, four weeks before his death, Rudi Gernreich unveiled the pubikini, a topless bathing suit that exposed the wearer's mons pubis and pubic hair. It was a thin, V-shaped, thong-style bottom that in the front featured a tiny strip of fabric that exposed the wearer's pubic hair. The pubikini was described as a pièce de résistance totally freeing the human body.

=== In history ===
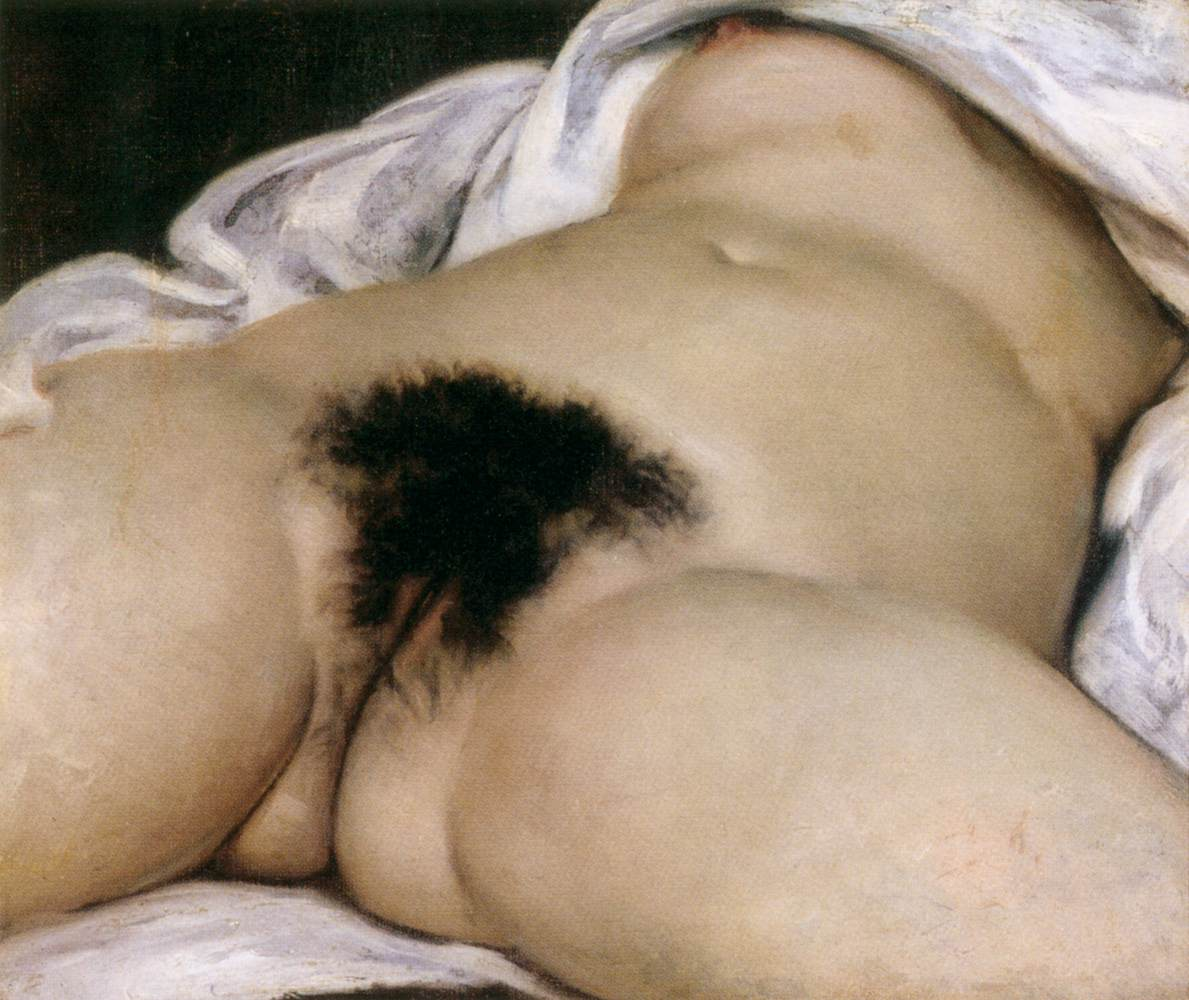
Gustave Courbet's L'Origine du monde, 1866

Evidence of pubic hair removal in ancient India is thought to date back to 4000 to 3000 BC. According to ethnologist F. Fawcett, writing in 1901, he had observed the removal of body hair, including pubic hair about the vulva, as a custom of women from the Hindu Nair caste.

In Western societies, after the spread of Christianity, public exposure of a woman's bare skin between the ankle and waist started to be disapproved of culturally. Upper body exposure due to the use of the popular vest bodices used in Western Europe from the 15th century to early 20th century, as the widespread dirndls used even in more traditionally conservative mountain areas and the more or less loose shirts under these, enabled a permissive view of the shoulders, décolletage and arms allowing a free exposure of upper body hair in women of all classes with less rejection or discrimination than body hair on the sex organs, obviously to conceal by implication. Many people came to consider public exposure of pubic hair to be embarrassing.

In the 1450s, British prostitutes shaved their pubic hair for purposes of personal hygiene and the combatting of pubic lice and would don merkins (or pubic wigs) when their line of work required it.

Among the British upper classes during the Georgian era, pubic hair from one's lover was frequently collected as a souvenir. The curls were, for instance, worn like cockades in men's hats as potency talismans or exchanged among lovers as tokens of affection. The museum of St. Andrews University in Scotland has in its collection a snuffbox full of pubic hair of one of King George IV's mistresses (possibly Elizabeth Conyngham), which the notoriously licentious monarch donated to the Fife sex club, The Beggar's Benison.

== See also ==
- Hair fetishism
- Pubic Wars
