= Continuing education unit =

Measure used for professionals to maintain licenses

A continuing education unit (CEU) or continuing education credit (CEC) is a measure used in continuing education programs to assist the professional to maintain their license in their profession. Continuing education or professional development is required in many fields, including teachers, insurance professionals, interior designers/interior architects, lighting designers, architects, engineers, emergency management professionals, school administrators, educators, nurses as well as mental health professionals including psychologists and social workers.

The term CEU is not a trademarked term; therefore, any educational institution may use it to describe their courses. In this regard, there are no requirements for educator qualifications that are attached to each institutions courses when offering CEUs. There have been some bodies created which are attempting to standardize and accredit institutions using the term CEU, such as the International Association for Continuing Education and Training. Professions and industries usually regulate their approved continuing education within their bylaws and not one institute or accrediting body has become a standard to accept in this regard.

== See also ==
- Continuing education
- Lifelong learning
