= List of Sinclair calculators =

This is a list of calculators produced by Clive Sinclair's company Sinclair Radionics:

- Sinclair Cambridge
  - Sinclair Cambridge Scientific
  - Sinclair Cambridge Memory
  - Sinclair Cambridge Memory %
  - Sinclair Cambridge Scientific Programmable
  - Sinclair Cambridge Universal
- Sinclair Executive
  - Sinclair Executive
  - Sinclair Executive Memory
- Sinclair Enterprise
- Sinclair Oxford
  - Sinclair Oxford 100
  - Sinclair Oxford 200
  - Sinclair Oxford 300
  - Sinclair Oxford Scientific
  - Sinclair Oxford Universal
- Sinclair President
  - Sinclair President
  - Sinclair President Scientific
- Sinclair Scientific
  - Sinclair Scientific
  - Sinclair Scientific Programmable
- Sinclair Sovereign

This is a list of calculators produced by Clive Sinclair's company Sinclair Instrument:

- Sinclair Wrist Calculator
