= Sinclair Scientific =

Scientific calculator introduced in 1974

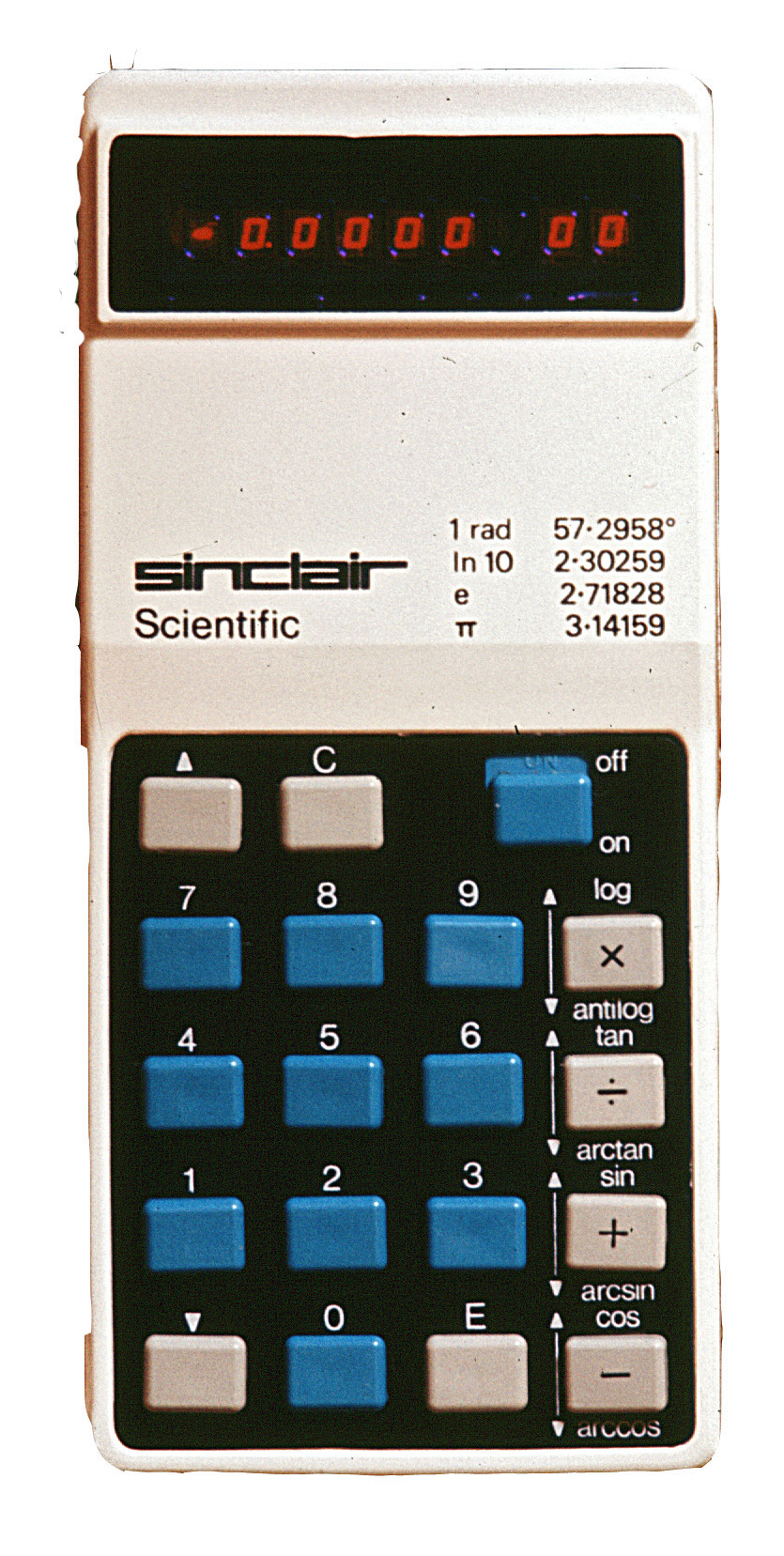
- Sinclair Scientific calculator photographed c. 1974
- Type: Scientific
- Manufacturer: Sinclair Radionics
- Introduced: 1974
- Cost: £49 + VAT

Calculator
- Entry mode: RPN
- Precision: 5 digit significand, 2 digit exponent
- Display type: Light-emitting diode

CPU
- Processor: Texas Instruments TMC-0805

Other
- Power supply: 4x AAA batteries (Scientific) 1x PP3 battery (Scientific Programmable)
- Dimensions: 50 by 111 by 19 millimetres (1.97 in × 4.37 in × 0.75 in) (Scientific) 73 by 155 by 34 millimetres (2.9 in × 6.1 in × 1.3 in) (Scientific Programmable)

The Sinclair Scientific was a 12-function, pocket-sized scientific calculator introduced in 1974, dramatically undercutting in price other calculators available at the time. The Sinclair Scientific Programmable, released a year later, was advertised as the first budget programmable calculator.

Significant modifications to the algorithms used meant that a chipset intended for a four-function calculator was able to process scientific functions, but at the cost of reduced speed and accuracy. Compared to contemporary scientific calculators, some functions were slow to execute, and others had limited accuracy or gave the wrong answer, but the cost of the Sinclair was a fraction of the cost of competing calculators.

== History ==
In 1972, Hewlett-Packard launched the HP-35, the world's first handheld scientific calculator. Despite market research suggesting that it was too expensive for there to be any real demand, production went ahead. It cost US$395 (about £165), but despite the price, over 300,000 were sold in the three and a half years for which it was produced.

From 1971, Texas Instruments had been making available the building block for a simple calculator on a single chip and the TMS0803 chipset appeared in a number of Sinclair calculators. Clive Sinclair wanted to design a calculator to compete with the HP-35 using this series of chips. Despite scepticism about the feasibility of the project from Texas Instruments engineers, Nigel Searle was able to design algorithms that sacrificed some speed and accuracy in order to implement scientific functions on the TMS0805 variation.

The Sinclair Scientific first appeared in a case derived from that of the Sinclair Cambridge, but it was not part of the same range. The initial retail price was £49.95 in the UK (equivalent to £345 in 2016), and in the US for US$99.95 as a kit or US$139.95 fully assembled. By July 1976, however, it was possible to purchase one for £7 (equivalent to £34 in 2016).

The Sinclair Scientific Programmable was introduced in August 1975, and was larger than the Sinclair Scientific, at 73 by 155 by 34 millimetres (2.9 in × 6.1 in × 1.3 in). It was advertised as "the first ... calculator to offer a ... programming facility ... at a price within the reach of the general public," but was limited by having only 24 program steps.

Both the Sinclair Scientific and the Sinclair Scientific Programmable were manufactured in England, like all other Sinclair calculators except the Sinclair President.

== Design ==
=== Sinclair Scientific ===
The HP-35 used five chips, and had been developed by twenty engineers at a cost of a million dollars, leading the Texas Instruments engineers to think that Sinclair's aim to build a scientific calculator around the TMS0805 chip, which could barely handle four-function arithmetic, was impossible. However, by sacrificing some speed and accuracy, Sinclair used clever algorithms to run scientific operations on a chip with room for just 320 instructions. Constants, rather than being stored in the calculator, were printed on the case below the screen.

It displays only in scientific notation, with a five digit mantissa and a two digit exponent, although a sixth digit of the mantissa was stored internally. Because of the way the processor was designed, it uses Reverse Polish notation (RPN) to input calculations. RPN meant that the difficult implementation of brackets, and the associated recursive logic, was not necessary to implement in the hardware, but the effort was instead offloaded to the user. Instead of an "equals" button, the + or − keys are used to enter the initial value of a calculation, followed by subsequent operand(s) each followed by their appropriate operator(s).

To fit the program into the 320 words available on the chip, some significant modification was used. By not using ordinary floating point numbers, which require many instructions to keep the decimal point in the right place, some space was freed up. Trigonometric functions were implemented in about 40 instructions, and inverse trigonometric functions took almost 30 more instructions. Logarithms are about 40 instructions, with anti-log taking about 20 more. The code to normalize and display the computed values is roughly the same in the TI and Sinclair programs.

The design of the algorithms meant that some calculations, such as arccos0.2, could take up to 15 seconds, whereas the HP-35 was designed to complete calculations in under a second. Accuracy in scientific functions was also limited to around three digits at best, and there were a number of bugs and limitations.

Ken Shirriff, an employee of Google, reverse engineered a Sinclair Scientific in 2013 and built a simulator using the original algorithms.

==== Assembly kit ====
The assembly kit consisted of eight groups of components, plus a carry case. The build time was advertised as being around three hours, and required a soldering iron and a pair of cutters. In January 1975, the kit was available for US$49.95, half the price at the time of introduction a year earlier, and in December 1975 it was available for £9.95, less than a quarter of the introductory price.

=== Sinclair Scientific Programmable ===
The Sinclair Scientific Programmable was introduced in 1975, with the same case as the Sinclair Oxford. It was larger than the Scientific, at 73 by 155 by 34 millimetres (2.9 in × 6.1 in × 1.3 in), and used a larger PP3 battery, but could also be powered by mains electricity.

It had 24-step programming abilities, which meant it was highly limited for many purposes. It also lacked functions for the natural logarithm and exponential function. Constants used in programs were required to be integers, and the programming was wasteful, with start and end quotes needed to use a constant in a program.

However, included with the calculator was a library of over 120 programs that performed common operations in mathematics, geometry, statistics, finance, physics, electronics, engineering, as well as fluid mechanics and materials science. There were over 400 programs in the full Sinclair Program Library.

=== Calculations using the Sinclair Scientific ===
The Sinclair used a slightly altered Reverse Polish Notation method; lacking an enter key, the operation keys enter a number into the appropriate register and the calculation is performed. For example, (1+2) × 3 could be calculated as: C 1 + 2 + 3 × to give the result of 9.0000 00 (9.0000×10^{0}, or 9). The C key performs a clear; pressing it sets the calculator to a state with zero in the internal registers. Pressing "C" followed by number keys then + effectively adds the number entered to the zero and stores it internally to be worked on in subsequent calculations. If the − key is pressed instead, the number is subtracted from zero, effectively entering a negative number.

All numbers are entered in scientific notation. After entering the mantissa part of the number, the "E" exponent key is pressed prior to entering the integer exponent of the number. The task of ordering the operations is placed on the user, and there are no bracket keys. The display shows only five digits, but six digits can be entered. As an example 12.3×(−123.4+123.456) could be entered as C 1 2 3 4 E 2 - 1 2 3 4 5 6 E 2 + 1 2 3 E 1 × for a displayed result of 6.8880 -01 (representing 6.8880×10^{−1}, or 0.68880).

Four constants are printed on the calculator case for easy reference. For converting to and from base 10 logarithms and natural logarithms, the natural logarithm of 10 (2.30259) and e (2.71828) are printed on the case. π (3.14159) and 57.2958 (180 / π) are also on the case for trigonometry calculations. There was not enough internal memory to store these constants internally. Angles are computed using radians; degree values must be converted to radians by dividing by 57.2958. As an example, to calculate 25 sin (600×0.05°) one would enter C 6 E 2 + 0 0 5 × 5 7 2 9 5 8 E 1 ÷ ▲ + 2 5 E 1 × to get a result of 1.2500 01 (representing 12.5 which is equal to 25 sin(30°) ). Sine is selected with the combination of the ▲ key followed by the + key. The ▼ (down) and ▲ (up) arrow keys are function select keys. The four operation keys (−, +, ÷ and ×) all have two other functions, activated by using one of the arrow keys. The functions available are sine, arcsine, cosine, arccosine, tangent, arctangent, logarithm and antilogarithm.
