= Sinclair Research =

British consumer electronics company

Sinclair Research Ltd
- Type: Limited company
- Industry: Computing; Electronics
- Founded: Cambridge, England, UK (1973; 53 years ago)
- Founder: Clive Sinclair
- Defunct: October 14, 2025; 12 months ago
- Headquarters: London, UK
- Key people: Nigel Searle, Director (1979 to 1986); Jim Westwood; Rick Dickinson, Designer
- Products: Sinclair ZX Spectrum; Sinclair QL
- Revenue: £102 million GBP (1985)
- Number of employees: 140 (1980s); 3 (1990); 1 (1997)

Sinclair Research Ltd was a British consumer electronics company founded by Clive Sinclair in Cambridge in the 1970s. In 1980, the company entered the home computer market with the ZX80 at £99.95 (equivalent to £429 in 2025), at that time the cheapest personal computer for sale in the United Kingdom. A year later, the ZX81 became available through retailers, introducing home computing to a generation, with more than 1.5 million sold. In 1982 the ZX Spectrum was released, becoming the UK's best selling computer, and competing aggressively against Commodore and Amstrad.

A combination of the failures of the Sinclair QL computer and the TV80 pocket television led to financial difficulties in 1985, and a year later Sinclair sold the rights to its computer products and brand name to Amstrad. Sinclair Research Ltd continued to exist as a one-man company, marketing Clive Sinclair's inventions.

== History ==
Profit and turnover data
Period	Profit	Turnover
1980	▲£131K	£640K
1981	▲£818K	£4.6m
1982	▲£8.55m	£27.17m
1983	▲£13.8m	£54.53m
1984	▲£14.28m	£77.69m
1985	▼ −£18m	£102m
1988 to 1989	▼ −£183K	£8K
1989 to 1990	▲£618K	£5K
1990 to 1991	▼ −£272K	£5K
1991 to 1992	▼ −£593K	£1K
1992 to 1993	▼ −£169K	£380K
1993 to 1994	▼ −£195K	£511K
1994 to 1995	▼ −£304K	£436K
1995 to 1996	▼ −£123K	£256K

=== Founding and early years ===
On 25 July 1961, Clive Sinclair founded his first company, Sinclair Radionics Ltd. in Cambridge. The company developed hi-fi products, radios, calculators and scientific instruments. When it became clear that Radionics was failing, Sinclair took steps to ensure that he would be able to continue to pursue his commercial goals. In February 1975, he changed the name of Ablesdeal Ltd (a shelf company he had bought in September 1973 for just such an eventuality) to Westminster Mail Order Ltd. The name was changed to Sinclair Instrument Ltd in August 1975.

Finding it inconvenient to share control after the National Enterprise Board became involved in Radionics in 1976, Sinclair encouraged Chris Curry to leave Radionics, which he had worked for since 1966, and get Sinclair Instrument operational. The company's first product was a watch-like Wrist Calculator.

=== Calculators ===
The Sinclair Executive was introduced in 1972 as the first calculator which could easily be carried in a pocket. It was also significantly cheaper than similarly featured 4-function calculators available at the time. The Sinclair Cambridge was launched in 1973 as a basic calculator and later in several enhanced versions supporting memory, advanced mathematical functions, and programmability. The Sinclair Scientific featuring trigonometric and logarithmic functions and employing Reverse Polish Notation was introduced in 1974.

=== Development of the ZX80 ===
In July 1977, Sinclair Instrument Ltd was renamed Science of Cambridge Ltd. Around the same time, Ian Williamson showed Chris Curry a prototype microcomputer based on a National Semiconductor SC/MP microprocessor and parts from a Sinclair calculator. Curry was impressed and encouraged Sinclair to adopt it as a product. In June 1978, Science of Cambridge launched its MK14 microcomputer in kit form.

In May 1979, Jim Westwood, Sinclair's chief engineer, designed a new microcomputer based on the Zilog Z80 microprocessor. Sinclair Instrument Ltd introduced the computer as the ZX80 in February 1980, as both a kit and ready-built.

=== Commercial success and home computers ===
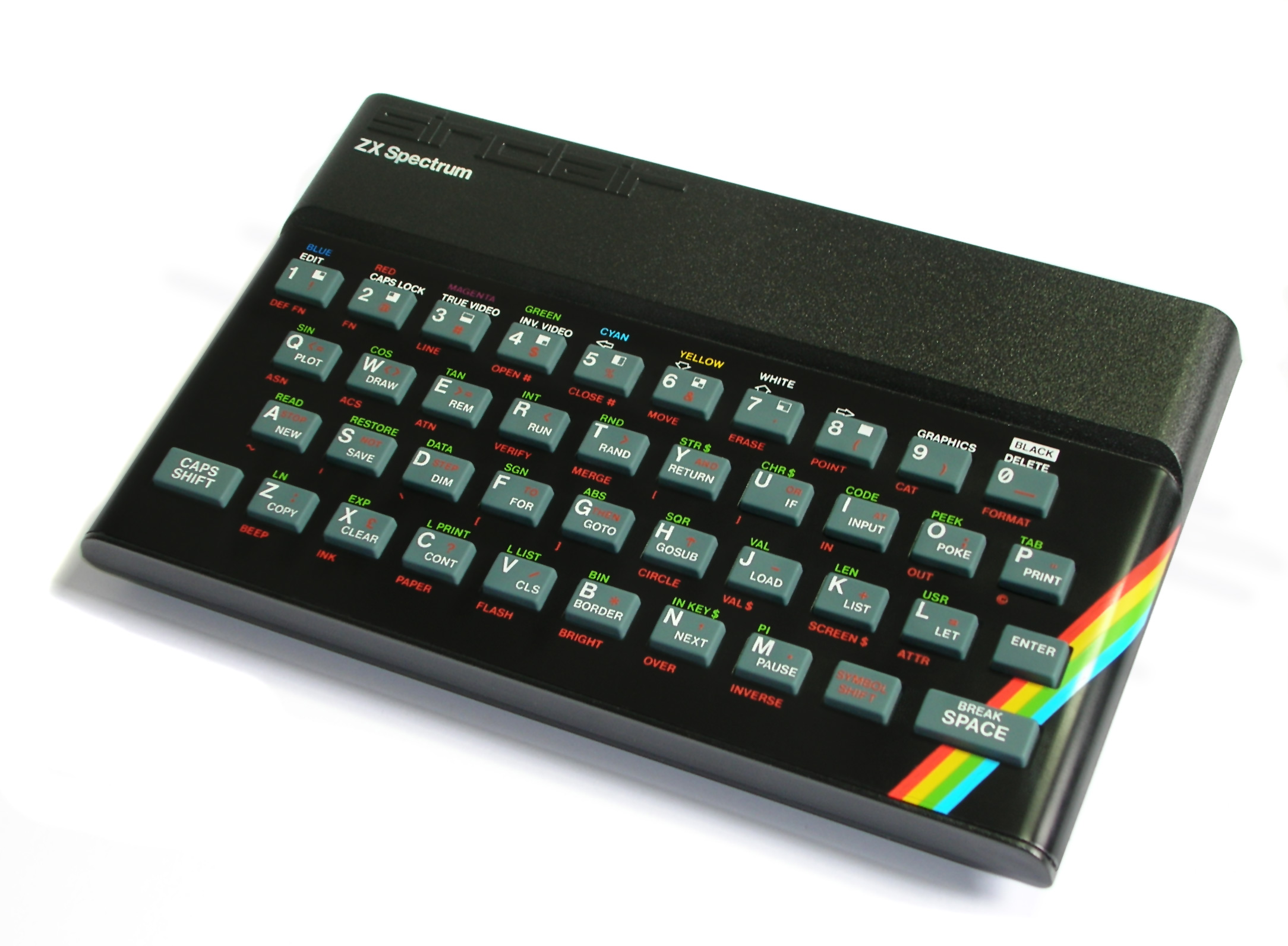
ZX Spectrum (1982)

The company was being known as Sinclair Research Ltd at the launch of the Sinclair ZX80 in January 1980, but as late as March 1981 it was still going by the Science of Cambridge name. In March 1981, Sinclair Computers was renamed Sinclair Research Ltd and the Sinclair ZX81 was launched. In February 1982, Timex Corporation obtained a license to manufacture and market Sinclair's computers in the USA under the name Timex Sinclair. In April the ZX Spectrum was launched. In July Timex launched the TS 1000 (a version of the ZX81) in the United States. In March 1982 Sinclair Research Ltd made an £8.55m profit on turnover of £27.17m, including a £383,000 government grant to develop a flat screen.

In 1982 Clive Sinclair converted the Barker & Wadsworth mineral water bottling factory at 25 Willis Road, Cambridge, into the company's new headquarters. (Following Sinclair's financial troubles, the premises were sold to Cambridgeshire County Council in December 1985.)

In January 1983 the ZX Spectrum personal computer was presented at the Las Vegas Consumer Electronics Show. In September the Sinclair TV80 pocket television was launched, but was a commercial failure.

In 1983 the company bought Milton Hall in the village of Milton, Cambridgeshire, for £2m, establishing its MetaLab research and development facility there.

In late 1983 Timex decided to pull out of the Timex Sinclair venture which, due to strong competition, had failed to break into the United States market. However, Timex computers continued to be produced for several years in other countries. Timex Portugal launched improved versions, the TS 2048 and 2068; that company also developed and launched the FDD3000, a floppy disk system, although it was not well received by the market.

=== Mid-1980s developments ===
The Sinclair QL was announced on 12 January 1984, shortly before the Apple Macintosh went on sale. The QL was nowhere near as successful as Sinclair's earlier computers. It suffered from several design flaws, and Your Sinclair noted that it was "difficult to find a good word for Sinclair Research in the computer press".

Fully working QLs were not available until late summer and complaints against Sinclair regarding delays were upheld by the Advertising Standards Authority in May of that year. (In 1982 it had upheld complaints about delays in shipping Spectrums.) Especially severe were allegations that Sinclair was cashing cheques months before machines were shipped. In the autumn Sinclair was still publicly predicting it would be a "million seller", and that 250,000 would be sold by the end of the year. QL production was suspended in February 1985, and the price was halved by the end of the year.

The ZX Spectrum+, a repackaged ZX Spectrum with a QL-like keyboard, was launched in October 1984 and appeared in WHSmith's shops the day after release. Retailers stocked the machine in large numbers in expectation of good Christmas sales. However, the machine did not sell as well as expected and, because retailers still had unsold stock, Sinclair's income from orders dipped alarmingly in January. The Spectrum+ had the same technical specifications as the original Spectrum. An enhanced model, the ZX Spectrum 128, was launched in Spain in September 1985, with development funded by the Spanish distributor Investronica. The UK launch of this was delayed until January 1986, because retailers had large unsold stocks of the previous model.

At the January 1985 Las Vegas Consumer Electronics Show, Sinclair re-entered the United States market, announcing the "FM Wristwatch Radio", an LCD wristwatch with a radio attached. However, the watch had several problems and never went into full production.

Sinclair had long had an interest in electric vehicles, and during the early 1980s he worked on the design of a single-seater "personal vehicle", eventually starting a company called Sinclair Vehicles Ltd in March 1983. He launched the Sinclair C5 electric vehicle on 10 January 1985, but it was a commercial disaster, selling only 17,000 units and losing Sinclair £7,000,000. Sinclair Vehicles went into liquidation later the same year. The failure of the C5, combined with those of the QL and the TV80, caused investors to lose confidence in Sinclair's judgement.

=== Amstrad acquisition of assets ===
Sinclair Research had reportedly intended a public offering of shares on 12 March 1985, but this offering was postponed, ostensibly due to turmoil in the microcomputer industry, with Acorn Computers undergoing refinancing, and other companies such as Sinclair's competitor Oric and distributor Prism entering receivership. Although the collapse of the latter was not expected to have a significant effect on Sinclair's ability to reach customers, the observation was made that "Sir Clive would not be trying to go public unless he thought he could use the cash", indicating that the postponement of an offering whose timing would have been planned for optimal effect would be a setback for the company.

On 28 May 1985, Sinclair Research had announced it wanted to raise an extra £10m to £15m to restructure the organisation. Given the loss of confidence in the company, the money proved hard to find. In June 1985, business magnate Robert Maxwell announced a takeover of Sinclair Research, through Hollis Brothers, a subsidiary of his Pergamon Press. However, the deal was aborted in August 1985.

The future of Sinclair Research remained uncertain until 7 April 1986, when the company sold its entire computer product range, and the "Sinclair" brand name, to Amstrad for £5 million. The deal did not include the company itself, only its name and products.

=== Spin-offs ===
Sinclair Research was reduced to an R&D business and a holding company, with shareholdings in several new "spin-off" companies formed to exploit technologies developed by the main company. These included Anamartic Ltd (wafer-scale integration), Shaye Communications Ltd (CT2 mobile telephony) and Cambridge Computer Ltd (Z88 portable computer and satellite television receivers).

=== Return to invention ===
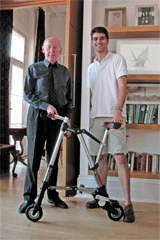
Inventors of the A-bike, Sir Clive Sinclair and Alexander Kalogroulis

Since 1986, the company has continued to exist, but in a completely different form. In 1993, 1994, and 1995 Sinclair made continuing losses on decreasing turnover. Investors became worried that Clive Sinclair himself was using his own personal wealth to fund his inventions. By 1990 the company's entire staff had been reduced to just Sinclair himself, a salesman/administrator, and an R&D employee. By 1997 only Sinclair himself was working at his company.

In 1992, the "Zike" electric bicycle was released, Sinclair's second attempt at changing people's means of transport. It had a maximum speed of 10 mph (16 km/h), and was only available by mail order. Much like the C5, the "Zike" was a commercial failure, and sold only 2,000 units. In 1999 Sinclair released the world's smallest radio, in the form of the "Z1 Micro AM Radio".

In 2003, the Sinclair "ZA20 Wheelchair Drive Unit" was introduced, designed and manufactured in conjunction with Hong Kong's Daka Designs, a partnership which also led to the SeaDoo Sea Scooter underwater propulsion unit.

July 2006 saw the release of the A-bike, a folding bicycle invented by Sinclair, which was on sale for £200. It had been originally announced two years previously. In November 2010, Sinclair Research announced the X-1 two-wheel electric vehicle, which failed to reach production.

== Products ==
Wrist Calculator

The Wrist Calculator was released by Sinclair Instrument in 1977.

Multimeter DM2

A digital multimeter with an LED display, measuring voltage (DC and AC), current and resistance, released in 1975.

MK14

The MK14 (Microcomputer Kit 14) was a computer kit sold by Science of Cambridge, introduced in 1977 for £39.95.

ZX80

The ZX80 home computer was launched in February 1980 at £79.95 in kit form and £99.95 ready-built. In November of the same year Science of Cambridge was renamed Sinclair Computers Ltd.

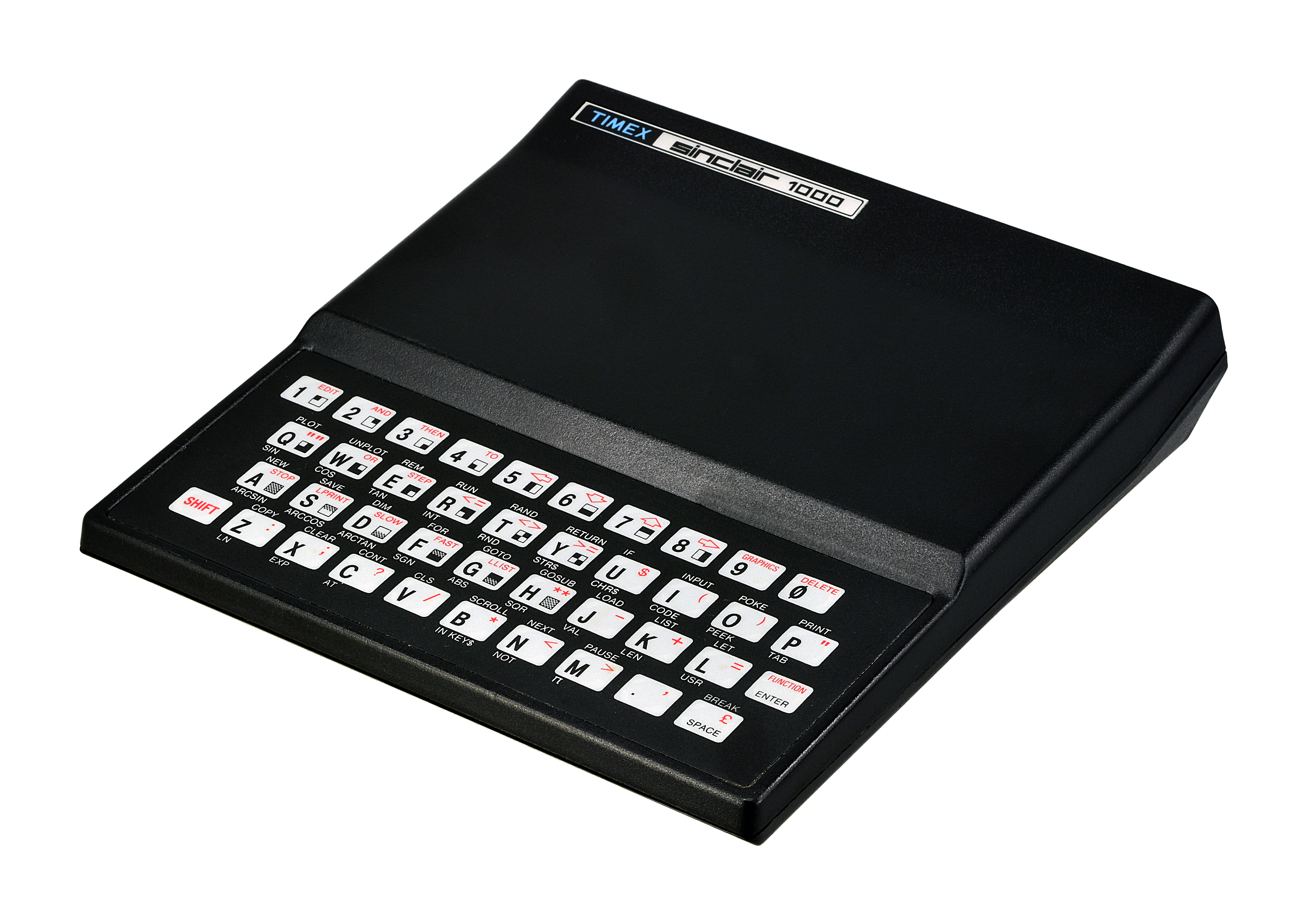
Timex Sinclair 1000, a U.S. version of the Sinclair ZX81

ZX81

The ZX81 (known as the TS 1000 in the United States) was priced at £49.95 in kit form and £69.95 ready-built, by mail order.

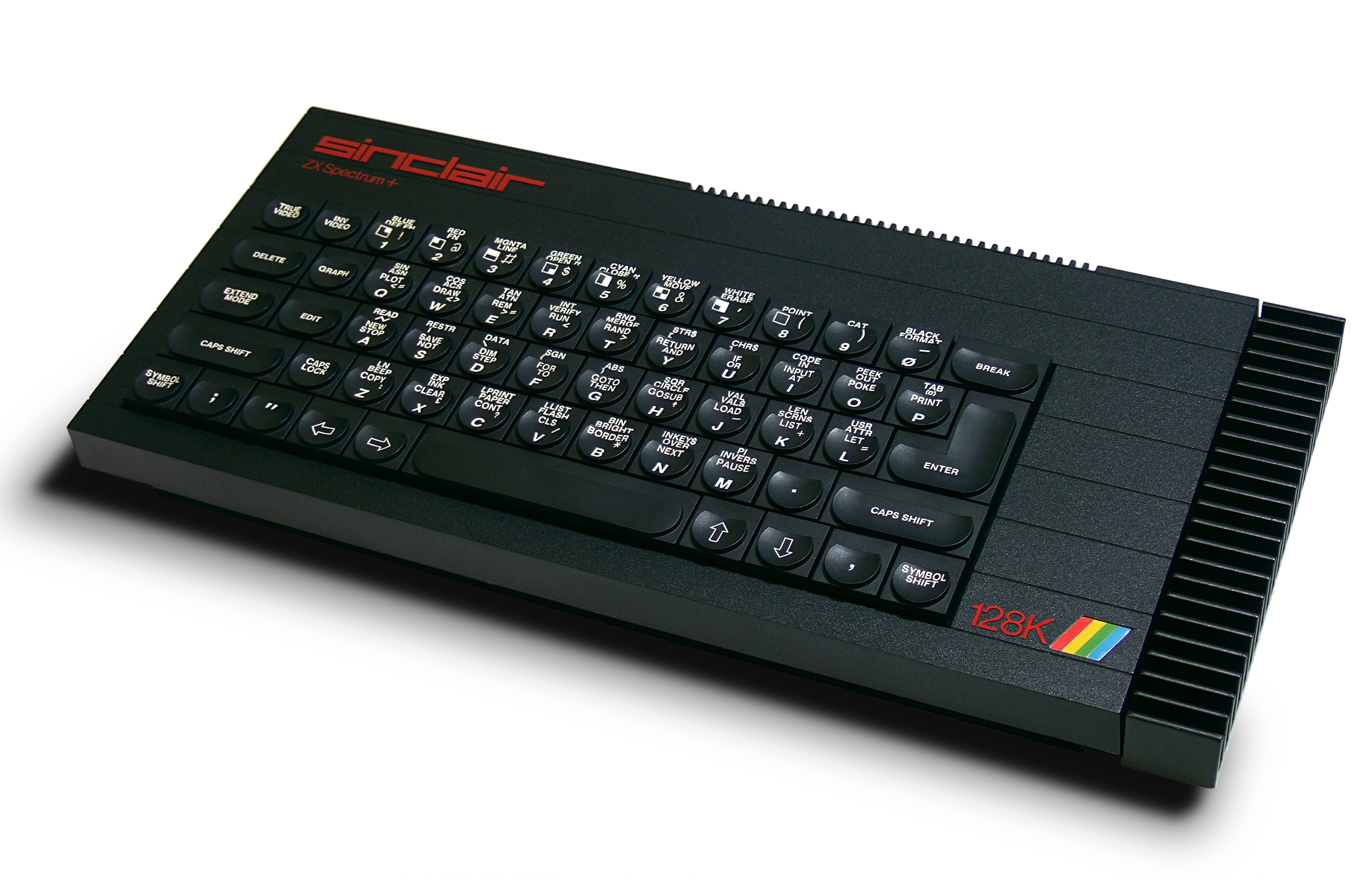
ZX Spectrum 128, an updated version of the original 1982 ZX Spectrum

ZX Spectrum

The ZX Spectrum was launched on 23 April 1982, priced at £125 for the 16 KB RAM version and £175 for the 48 KB version.

TV80

The TV80 was a pocket television. Launched in September 1983, it used a flattened CRT unlike Sinclair's previous portable televisions. The TV80 was a commercial failure selling only 15,000 units and not covering its development costs of £4m.

Sinclair QL

The Sinclair QL was announced in January 1984, priced at £399. Marketed as a more sophisticated 32-bit microcomputer for professional users, it used a Motorola 68008 processor. Production was delayed by several months, due to unfinished development of hardware and software at the time of the QL's launch. Hardware reliability problems and software bugs resulted in the QL acquiring a poor reputation from which it never recovered.

ZX Spectrum+

The ZX Spectrum+ was a repackaged ZX Spectrum 48K, launched in October 1984.

ZX Spectrum 128

The ZX Spectrum 128, with RAM expanded to 128 kB, a sound chip and other enhancements, was launched in Spain in September 1985 and the UK in January 1986, priced at £179.95.

Computer peripherals

Sinclair created various peripherals for its computers, including memory expansion modules, the ZX Printer, and the ZX Interface 1 and ZX Interface 2 add-ons for the ZX Spectrum. A number of QL peripherals were developed by other companies but marketed under the Sinclair brand. External storage for the Spectrum was usually on cassette tapes, as was common in that era. Rather than an optional floppy disk drive, Sinclair instead opted to offer its own mass storage system, the ZX Microdrive, a tape-loop cartridge system that proved unreliable. This was also the primary storage device for the QL.

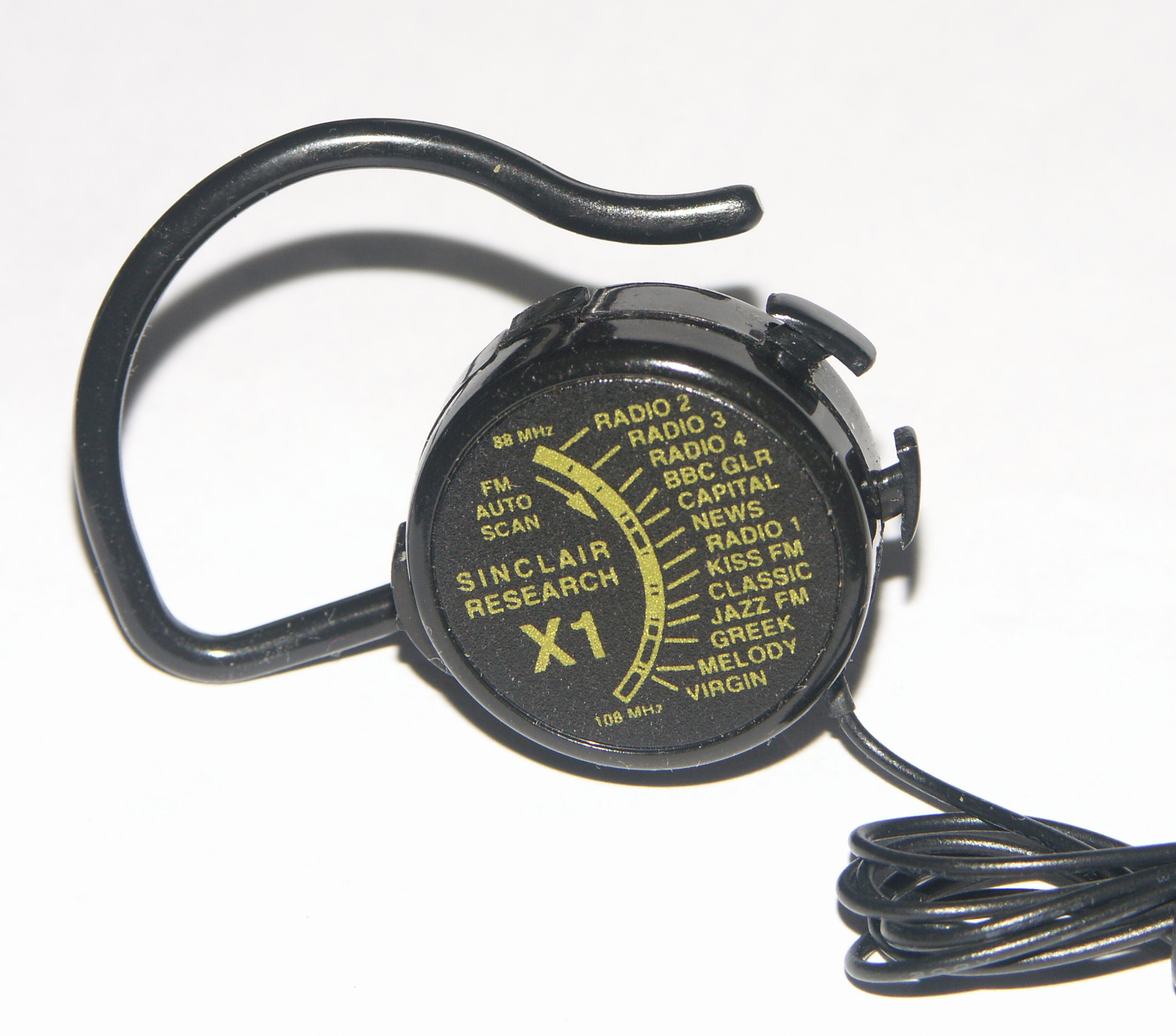
X1 Button Radio (1997)

X1 Button FM Radio

In June 1997 Sinclair Research released the X1 radio for £9.50. This miniature mono FM radio, powered by a CR2032 battery, had a fixed volume and was inserted in the ear. The X1 radio had three buttons, an on/off switch, a Scan button, and a Reset button to restart the scanning process. It came with a short length of aerial and a detachable ear hook.

=== Cancelled projects ===
The following computer products were under development at Sinclair Research during the 1980s but never reached production:

LC3

Standing for "Low Cost Colour Computer", the LC3 was developed during 1983 by Martin Brennan and was intended to be a cheap Z80-based games console implemented in two chips, using ROM and (non-volatile) RAM cartridges for storage. A multi-tasking operating system for the LC3, with a full windowing GUI, was designed by Steve Berry. It was cancelled in November 1983 in favour of the QL.

SuperSpectrum

Intended to be a 68008-based home computer, equipped with built-in ZX Microdrive, joystick, RS-232 and ZX Net ports. Sinclair's SuperBASIC programming language was originally intended for this model but was later adopted for the QL. SuperSpectrum was cancelled in 1982 after the specification of the ZX83 (QL) had converged with it. This project is not to be confused with Loki, which was described as the "SuperSpectrum" in an article in the June 1986 issue of Sinclair User magazine.

Pandora

This was to be a portable computer with an integral flat-screen CRT display. Initially to be ZX Spectrum-compatible with a faster Z80 CPU, a built-in ZX Microdrive and a new 512×192-pixel monochrome video mode. Due to the limited size of flat CRT that could be manufactured, a series of folding lenses and mirrors were necessary to magnify the screen image to a usable size. The project was cancelled after the Amstrad take-over, but the Pandora concept eventually transformed into the Cambridge Computer Z88.

Loki

This project was intended to create a greatly enhanced ZX Spectrum, possibly rivalling the Commodore Amiga. Loki was to have a 7 MHz Z80H CPU, 128 KiB of RAM, and two custom chips providing much enhanced graphics and audio capabilities. After the Amstrad buy-out in 1986, two engineers who had worked on the project, John Mathieson and Martin Brennan, founded Flare Technology to continue their work.

Bob/Florin

According to Rupert Goodwins, this was a project to produce an add-on floppy disk drive for the ZX Spectrum.

Tyche

This codename was assigned to a QL follow-on project running from 1984 to 1986. Among the features associated with Tyche were increased RAM capacity, internal floppy disk drives, the Psion Xchange application suite on ROM, and possibly the GEM GUI.

Janus

This name has been associated with a design concept for a "Super QL" based on wafer-scale integration technology.

Proteus

This was rumoured to be a hypothetical portable version of the QL similar to Pandora.

Sinclair X-1

In November 2010 Sinclair told The Guardian newspaper that he was working on a new prototype electric vehicle, called the X-1, to be launched within a year. "Technology has moved on quite a bit, there are new batteries available and I just rethought the thing. The C5 was OK, but I think we can do a better job now." The two-wheel X-1 was to have been available in July 2011 at the price of £595, but failed to reach production.

== See also ==
- Sinclair BASIC
- Sinclair C5
- Sinclair Executive
- Sinclair Radionics
- Sinclair Scientific
- Sinclair Vehicles
- Timex Sinclair
- TV80
- Sinclair President
