= Grundy NewBrain =

Microcomputer

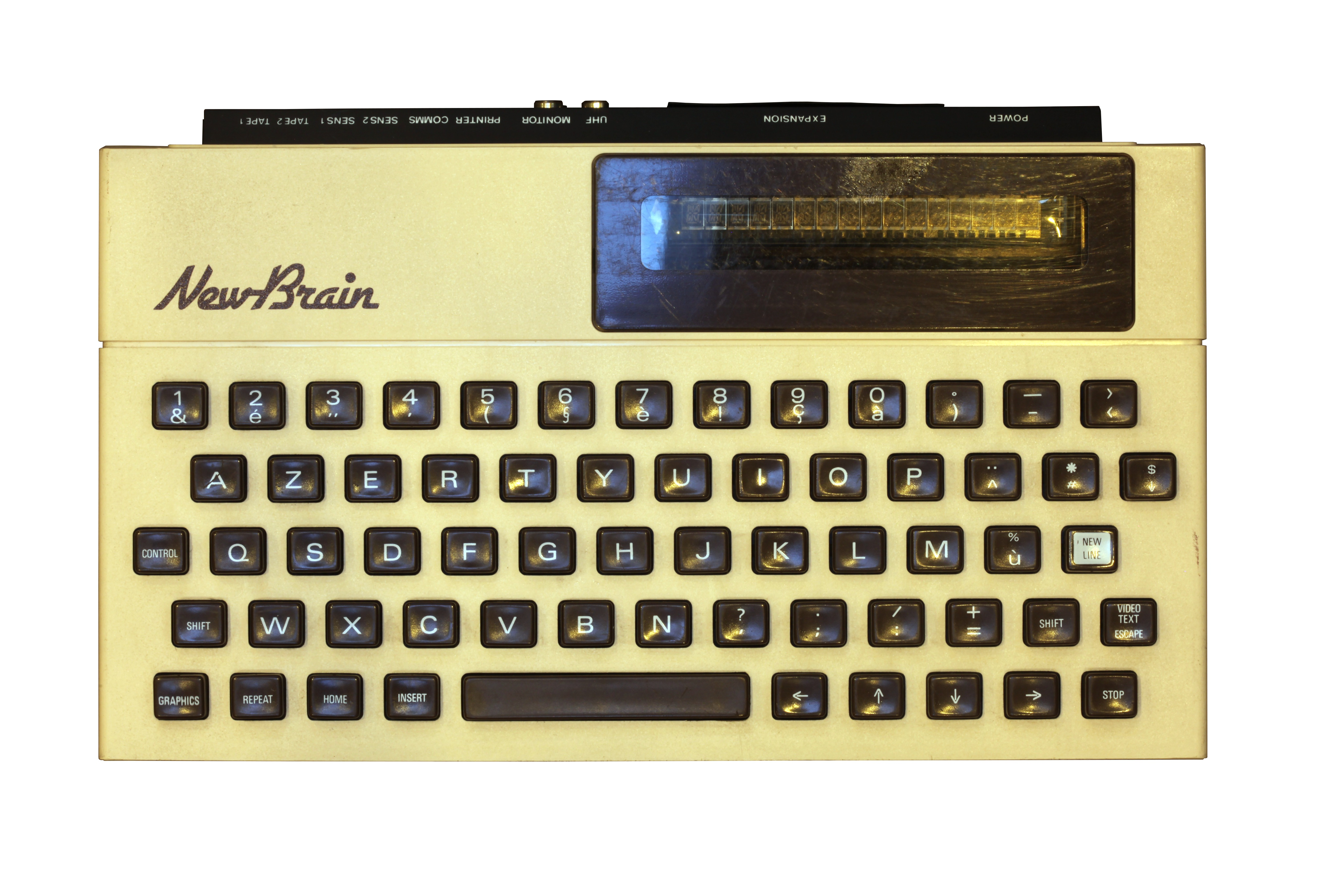
- Type: Microcomputer; Portable computer
- Released: July 1982; 44 years ago
- Introductory price: Model AD 229.00 GBP, Model A 199.00 GBP (United Kingdom, 1982), 48,000.00 GRD (Greece, 1985)
- System on a chip: Keyboard and one-line VF display chip: COP420 MCU
- CPU: 8 bits Zilog Z80A @ 4 MHz
- Memory: 32 KiB RAM (Maximum 2 MiB); 24 KiB ROM
- Display: Text modes: 32×25, 32×30, 40×25, 40×30, 64×25, 64×30, 80×25, 80×30
- Graphics: Composite video, UHF TV output Graphics modes: 256×256, 320×256, 512×256, 640×256; Total number of colours: 2
- Input: 62 keys I/O Ports:2× Tape recorder (1,200 Baud), Expansion, 2x RS-232 (to 19,000 Baud)

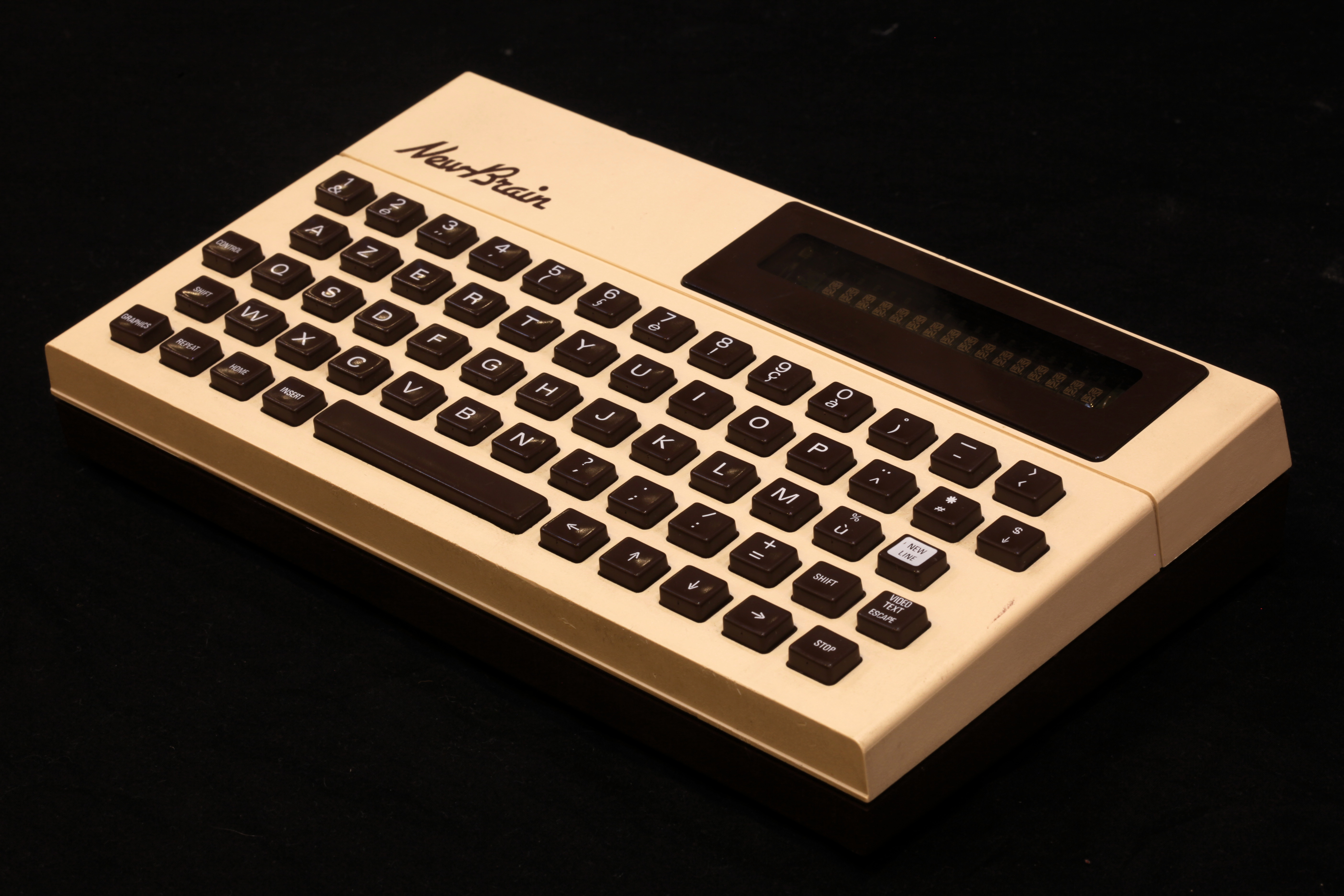
GBS Newbrain AD with a French keyboard. On display at the Musée Bolo, EPFL, Lausanne.

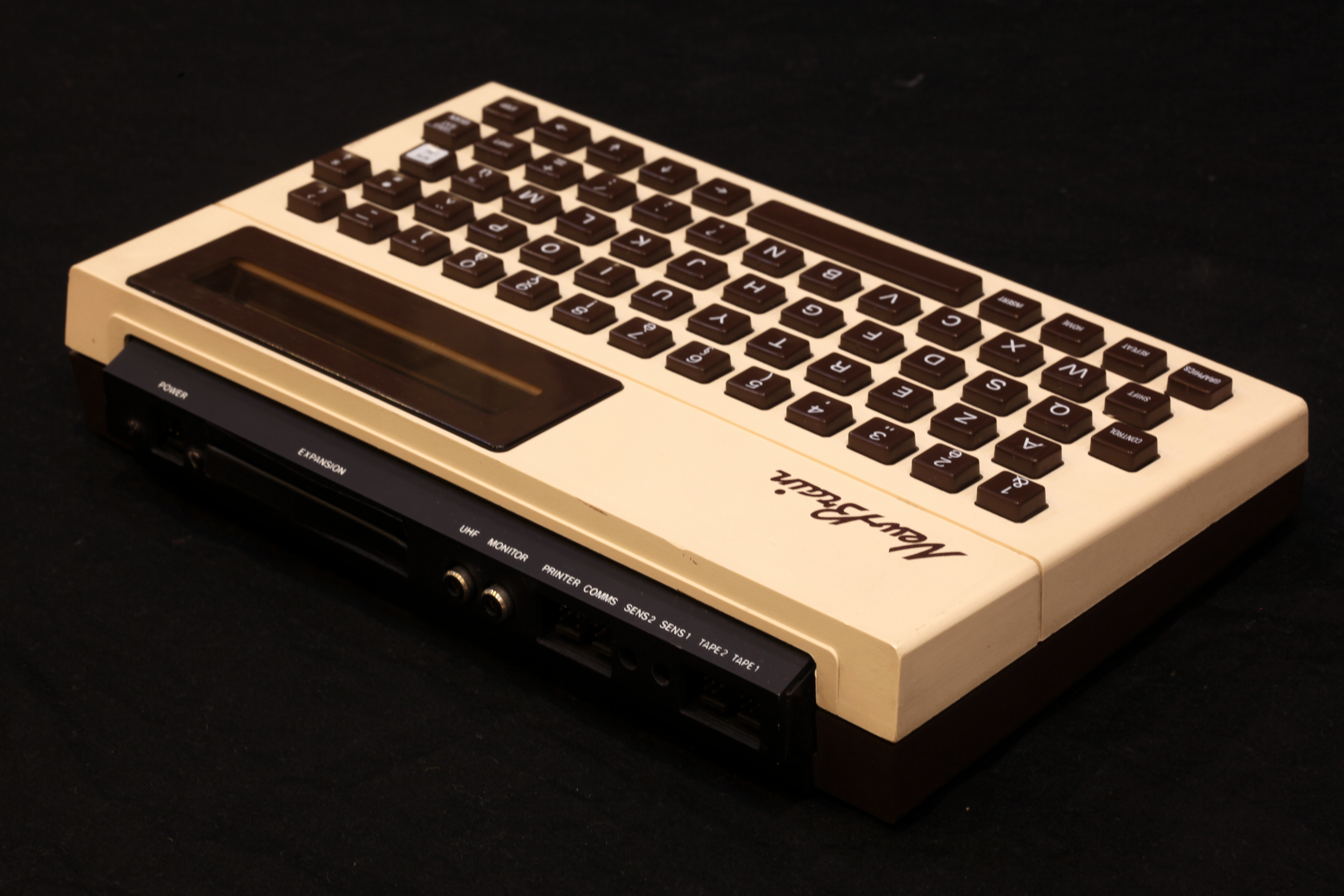
View of the connectors of the same machine.

The Grundy NewBrain was a line of microcomputers launched in 1982 by Grundy Business Systems Ltd of Teddington and Cambridge, England. A contemporary of the ZX80 and BBC Micro, the NewBrain was mostly used in business settings. It is notable for its chiclet keyboard and models that featured a one-line display, allowing them to be used as a portable computer, in addition to television output. Another unique feature of the system was NewBrain BASIC, a BASIC programming language that featured an on-the-fly compiler.

Originally designed at Sinclair Radionics, government ownership of that company led to Clive Sinclair leaving the company and starting a new low-cost design, the ZX80. The original project was then taken over by a series of government-run companies. It was considered for the BBC Micro project, but development was not complete and that was won by Acorn Computers instead. The design was then sold off by the government to recently formed Grundy. Grundy produced the system between 1982 and 1983, with approximately 50,000 units sold during this period. The design was then sold to Dutch firm Tradecom to fill a contract for computers in training centres. These units came from existing stocks, and plans to open a factory in India never materialized.

== History ==
=== Beginnings ===
Through the mid-1970s, Clive Sinclair's firm Sinclair Radionics entered a period of financial difficulties. This led to investment from the National Enterprise Board (NEB) in 1976 to ensure the company did not foreclose. The NEB had formed the previous year to nationalize technology companies considered critical to the UK.

Seeing his management of the company would suffer, Sinclair dusted off a company he had purchased and left unused, a shelf company, and formed Sinclair Instrument. He asked Radionics employee Christopher Curry to start it up, and in July 1977, Sinclair Instrument was renamed Science of Cambridge Ltd. Around the same time, Curry was introduced to a new small computer designed by Ian Williamson that combined a National Semiconductor SC/MP central processing unit (CPU) with parts from one of Sinclair's calculator designs. Curry put this on the market as the MK14 in June 1978, for the very low price of £40.

Curry wanted to start the development of a larger machine similar to the Apple II, but the company simply didn't have the funds to develop it. In 1978, the NEB agreed to fund the development of such a machine at Radionics, instead of Science of Cambridge. This prompted Curry to leave the company, and partner with Hermann Hauser to form Acorn Computers. At Radionics, development began with Mike Wakefield as the designer and Basil Smith as the software engineer.

In early 1979, the NEB sold off Radionics' calculator product lines. In July, Sinclair had enough of the NEB and quit, moving to Science of Cambridge. In return, the NEB renamed Radionics to Sinclair Electronics in September and the company was dedicated to bringing the new machine to market. Meanwhile, at Science of Cambridge, Sinclair began the development of a much simpler machine with the goal of hitting a sub-£100 price point. This would emerge in early 1980 as the ZX80. The company was renamed Sinclair Research in 1981 and the upgraded ZX81 launched.

In January 1980 the former Radionics once again renamed to become Thandar Electronics, but the 1979 Conservative government under Margaret Thatcher began selling off government-owned properties and did so in this case by selling Thandar to Thurlby Electronics, who had no interest in the computer project. The NEB then transferred the computer project to another NEB-owned company, Newbury Laboratories.

Newbury gave it the name NewBrain and announced the imminent release of three models, including a battery-powered portable computer. By this time the machine was no longer as innovative as it had been when first designed; in 1980 Personal Computer World said it was "significantly in advance of anything that had been seen in the field of handheld computing", but by the end of that year with the systems still not released, and it was not long before Your Computer noted "the endless delays in its development mean that it has now lagged behind a new generation of personal computers."

=== BBC micro project ===
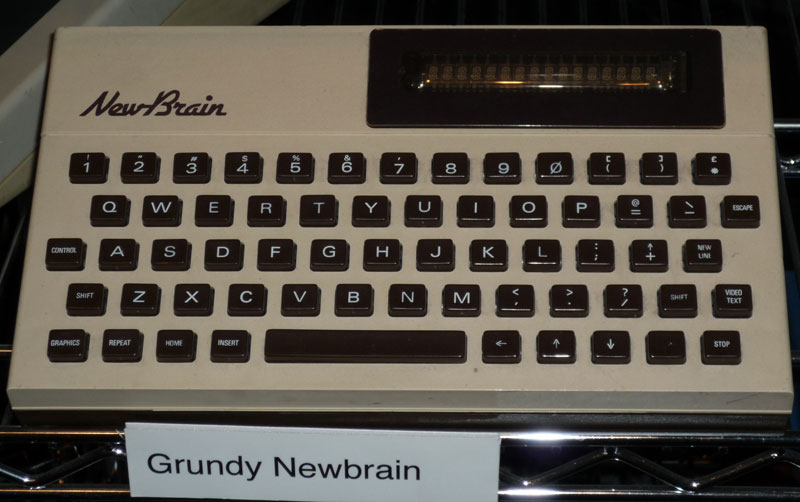
An English AD model, clearly showing the 16-character display, on show at The National Museum of Computing

In early 1980, the British Broadcasting Corporation (BBC) Further Education department conceived the idea of a computer literacy programme, principally in response to the impact of a 1979 six-part ITV documentary series, The Mighty Micro, in which Dr Christopher Evans from the UK National Physical Laboratory predicted the coming (micro) computer revolution. It was a very influential documentary — so much so that questions were asked in Parliament.

As a result of the questions in Parliament, the Department of Industry (DoI) became interested in the programme. BBC Engineering was instructed to attempt to draw up an objective specification for a machine that the programme could be tailored to, and under pressure from the DoI, they wanted to choose a UK-built system. The market provided few alternatives, so the BBC specification was closely written around the NewBrain specification with the expectation they would bid on the project.

The BBC released the specification in 1981, but at this time Newbury was nowhere near ready to go into production as they were having problems with the uncommitted logic arrays (ULAs) that provided much of the customization. The BBC's programmes, initially scheduled for Autumn 1981, were moved back to Spring 1982. By this time, Sinclair and Curry had also heard of the project, and demanded they be allowed to bid on it. Sinclair were well down the road with the ZX80, which was a much simpler machine that could not come close to meeting the original specification. Curry visited the BBC and convinced them they were ready to go with a machine that could mostly meet the specification. Acorn won the contract.

As a result of the BBC's decision, Newbury no longer had a launch customer for the NewBrain. The British Technology Group, which had replaced the NEB by this time, sold the final design and production rights to the recently formed Grundy Business Systems (GBS). GBS had formed in November with the intention of selling a machine similar to the Intertec Superbrain, which combined a VT100-like terminal with floppy drives and a CP/M 2.2-based computer. Looking for a way to enter the consumer market, they purchased the NewBrain, and announced a complete suite of machines.

=== Release ===
By the summer of 1982, the company had been talking about the systems for some time, and the marketing department announced that the CP/M machines would be available beginning in January 1983, to be known as the Grundy 8200. This was a surprise to the engineering department, who stated it could not possibly be ready before April, although in the end they beat this date. Meanwhile, the company announced pre-orders for the NewBrain, and this produced a flood of orders during the Christmas 1982 season, leading the company to increase production to a target of 10,000 units a month.

Machines began shipping in early 1983, but the sales efforts were ham-handed. Dealers were provided with no marketing material, few manuals and almost no software. Peripheral support was likewise spotty, and the compact cassette systems used for program storage was particularly unreliable, but this fact was apparently not passed back from marketing to engineering. A better player was available from Japan, but had a 26-week lead time and could only deliver 120 a month. Other devices, like a computer-controlled cassette deck, a plotter from Tandy and a low-cost modem were considered but never completed.

Over 50,000 NewBrain units were sold to educational, scientific, industry, small business and banking sectors; as well as to home users. Scientific use was strong because of the unusually high precision of the NewBrain's floating point computations and its very high-resolution graphics. Business use was also proportionally high due to the availability of CP/M based software. The main industrial use was within the pharmaceutical industry. The computer was widely used by the Angolan Government; the central planning of the Angolan Ministry of Commerce in 1981 - 1984 were made using this machine instead of much more expensive computers.

=== Demise ===
Tradecom purchased Grundy Business Systems in 1983 in order to fulfil a contract to supply microcomputers to schools and training centres in the Netherlands. They created a server to which several NewBrains could use its floppy discs to load programs down the serial cable and simple switching enabled the teacher to view the screen of the students. They also demonstrated a keyboard with predictive text laid out in a non-QWERTY fashion. They were given television coverage, but the NewBrain's part in this was not mentioned. Tradecom's NewBrains were supplied entirely by existing stock. A press release was made of a new factory in India to provide NewBrains for the Indian market and to supply Europe, but nothing materialised.

=== Today ===
The Dutch NewBrain user group has PDF downloads of various publications and a link to a Greek website that contains a PC-based emulator. The Dutch website has many of the programs that were available for the NewBrain, and these can be run on the emulator.

== Models ==
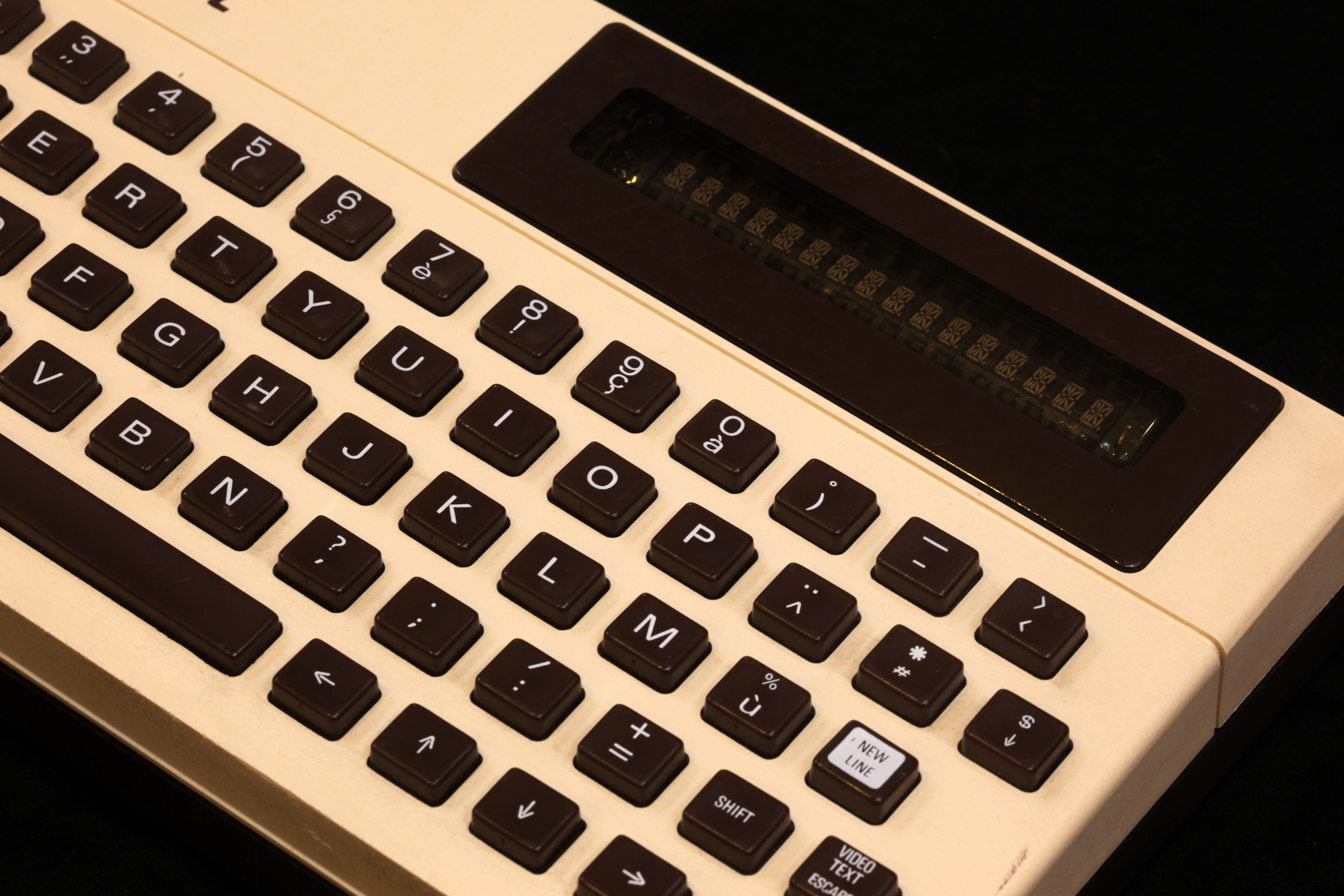
Detail of the screen of an AD (one-line integrated display) model. On display at the Musée Bolo, EPFL, Lausanne.

Two main models were released. The model 'A' needed an external TV or a monitor for its display. The model 'AD' also included a one-line, 16-character, vacuum fluorescent (VF) display on the unit which permitted operation with or without a TV screen or monitor — the VF display responded to the cursor keys and scrolled around the screen display area. One additional model was released, but this was a custom version for a pharmaceutical chain, with no screen display — only the VF display — and was not widely known. This was used by Vestric Ltd for stock taking.

An expansion chassis was released, providing an additional 64 kB of paged memory. Since the Z80 has a 16-bit address bus, it can only address 64 kB of memory at a time. The paged memory system in the expansion chassis used bank switching to allow the NewBrain to take advantage of several 64 kB modules. The expansion module included a parallel printer port and two hardware based serial ports and an expansion bus to connect further modules such as the 8 and 16 way serial modules under development. The expansion module included Series 2 software, replacing those in the processor module as well as software for the new devices.

CP/M 2.2 was also available. Under CP/M 2.2 the internal BASIC ROM was paged out for the CP/M ROM but this gave only 32 kB memory to CP/M. With the expansion module fitted the three 8 kB ROMs of the processor module were paged out to give the NewBrain one of the highest available TPA (Transient Program Area — memory left after the OS demands are satisfied) to CP/M. Grundy Business Systems released two 5.25" drive formats, 40 track 200 kB single sided and 80 track 800 kB double-sided. Several independent dealers provided 40 track 400 kB double-sided drive. In 1983 the Sony 3.5" became available and single and paired units were supplied to dealers in the NewBrain cream cases. The 3.5" 800 kB discs also got a more effective format allowing the files from 4x200 kB floppies to be stored on one 800 kB disc.

== Software ==
The unexpanded NewBrain contains software provided in ROM, primarily BASIC, a full screen editor and device drivers. Other packages were also included within the ROM (e.g. maths and graphics packages) and were accessible to BASIC and any other software.

All I/O was stream-based, and orthogonal: any device could be replaced by an alternative, although the manual did warn that devices had to be chosen with care. This approach did make it easy to write programs that could swap between input and output coming from a screen, keyboard or tape.

The maths package had 12 figures of accuracy and a dynamic range of 10^{−150} to 10^{150}, compared to most common machines having 6-figure accuracy and a dynamic range of 10^{−38} to 10^{+38}. This was achieved by using base 256 for the floating point format, rather than the more common base 2, and using six bytes for storing numbers, rather than the more common four. Five bytes stored the basic number, with the last byte storing the sign in the first bit, and the remaining seven bits storing the exponent. For example, π was stored as 3.14159265358.

Benchmarks show that even though the NewBrain performed double accuracy calculations, it was one of the fastest 8-bit computers available for several years, completing PCW Benchmark 8 in 7.0 seconds. For comparison against other contemporary machines, the Sinclair Spectrum took 25.3 seconds, the BBC Micro took 5.1 seconds, but with fewer significant digits. The 16-bit IBM PC took 3.5 seconds.

The graphics screen was separate from the text screen and was opened as a new output stream that shared space with the text screen. The graphics commands were based on 'turtle' keywords and provided a flexible means of drawing. The last two generations of NewBrain ROMs included additional graphics commands — ROM 1.9 had two more commands, and ROM 2.0 some more. But to ensure compatibility little software would use these additional commands. The programmers were working on version 2.2 as well as versions for different keyboards, including Greek and Swedish as well as French and German. Grundy had been considering offering the Series 2 ROMs to existing users. This required the existing soldered in ROMs to be removed from the circuit board and a socket soldered in. The tight fit and labour cost was high on this retrofitting, and the failure of the company in 1983 meant that users were never aware that this was being considered.

The version of BASIC was an extended version of ANSI BASIC, the facilities of which were similar to those in Microsoft BASIC. The graphics package included commands that could draw dots, lines, arcs, filled-in areas and annotated axes.

Grundy offered a 'Software Technical Manual'. This manual documented various routines that could be called in the ROM and the calling parameters. It was left to the NewBrain user groups to publish the details of how to access these routines through the indirect call. (A low-memory address was called with the relevant routine parameters, and this address would call the ROM-specific location of a jump table which, in turn, then called the final routine.) Even screen access required this indirect use, as the screen location would change as new input and output streams were created, including high-resolution (for the time) graphic streams. Memory maps and other technical information were included in numerous technical notes which were supplied to dealers and owners free of charge. The Technical Manual had a retail price of £58.

HiSoft Systems produced NewBrain versions of their Pascal compiler and editor. A number of CP/M applications were converted to using the NewBrain's CP/M terminal and made available on NewBrain 5.25" and 3.5" formatted diskettes. These included Z80 assemblers and debuggers, Pro Pascal and Pro Fortran, Tcl Pascal, dBase II, WordStar 3.3, Peachtree Accounting applications, the Superfile database and CP/M versions of Hisoft Pascal, Modula-2, Z80 Assembler and text editor.

Many third-party software houses (e.g. IEL, MicroMart, Black Knight Computers) provided independent software for the NewBrain, which was supplied to users such as the British Ministry of Defence, and Cambridge University.
