= Micro Men =

British TV programme

- Title card
- Genre: Documentary drama
- Created by: Andrea Cornwell
- Written by: Tony Saint
- Directed by: Saul Metzstein
- Starring: Alexander Armstrong; Martin Freeman
- Theme music composer: Vangelis
- Opening theme: "Pulstar"
- Composer: Ilan Eshkeri
- Country of origin: United Kingdom
- Original language: English

Production
- Executive producers: Elinor Day; Jamie Laurenson
- Producer: Andrea Cornwell
- Cinematography: Hubert Taczanowski
- Editor: Ian Davies
- Running time: 84 mins

Original release
- Network: BBC Four
- Release: 8 October 2009

Micro Men is a 2009 one-off BBC drama television programme set in the late 1970s and the early-mid 1980s, about the rise of the British home computer market and the early fortunes of Sinclair and Acorn Computers. It focuses on the rivalry between Sir Clive Sinclair (played by Alexander Armstrong), who developed the ZX Spectrum, and Chris Curry (played by Martin Freeman), the man behind the BBC Micro.

== Plot ==
The drama is centred on two of the leading players and their respective companies in the home computer market of the late 1970s and early 1980s focusing on the race to win a grant from the BBC to become the provider of a home computer for the BBC's programming for schools. Certain parts of the drama are based on historical fact while others are a dramatisation.

The main characters are ZX Spectrum creator Clive Sinclair and BBC Micro creators Chris Curry, Sophie Wilson, Steve Furber and Hermann Hauser. The real-life Wilson also makes a brief cameo as a barmaid.

== Cast ==
- Alexander Armstrong as Clive Sinclair
- Martin Freeman as Chris Curry
- Edward Baker-Duly as Hermann Hauser
- Sam Phillips as Steve Furber
- Stefan Butler as Roger Wilson
- Colin Michael Carmichael as Jim Westwood
- Derek Riddell as Nigel Searle
- Peter Davison as Bank Manager

=== Cameo ===
- Sophie Wilson plays a pub landlady.
- Chris Serle and Ian McNaught-Davis also appear through the incorporation of stock footage from The Computer Programme, during the scenes when Steve Furber is desperately trying to keep the demonstration BBC Micros running behind the studio set.
- Jim Westwood appears in the background of a scene set in the computer department of a WH Smith store.

== Production ==
=== Development ===
The programme was created by independent production company Darlow Smithson and was written by Tony Saint, directed by Saul Metzstein and produced by Andrea Cornwell. It was produced as a BBC Drama, shot in the UK, with some scenes shot in and around the colleges of Cambridge on 15 July 2009. Computers were supplied by The Centre for Computing History, then in Haverhill. They also supplied other technical props, including the Sinclair C5, and Jason Fitzpatrick, director of the museum, played the part of David Johnson-Davies.

The programme's titles use a green lettering font similar to that produced by the 1980s monitors to which BBC Microcomputers would have typically been connected.

=== Soundtrack ===
The soundtrack uses a number of early 1980s electronica tracks: Though not all tracks are limited to that decade.

- "Paranoid" by Black Sabbath
- "Layla" by Eric Clapton
- "A Fifth of Beethoven" by Walter Murphy
- "Pulstar" by Vangelis
- "Zoolookologie" by Jean Michel Jarre
- "Oxygène (Part IV)" by Jean Michel Jarre
- "Two Tribes" by Frankie Goes to Hollywood
- "99 Red Balloons" by Nena
- "Pipes of Peace" by Paul McCartney
- "Another Brick in the Wall" by Pink Floyd
- "Title" from The Carpetbaggers by Jimmy Smith
- "Computer World 2" by Kraftwerk
- "Wouldn't It Be Good" by Nik Kershaw
- "Planet Earth" by Duran Duran

== Release ==
It was first shown on BBC Four on 8 October 2009.

== Reaction ==
When asked about the programme in an interview for The Independent — despite being involved in the production — Sinclair himself stated: "It was a travesty of the truth. It just had no bearing on the truth. It was terrible."

== See also ==
- Micro Live
