= OKTV (interactive television service) =

Defunct interactive television service

OKTV was an interactive television handset service employed by SMG for Scottish Television and Grampian Television. It was touted as a world first by the company upon introduction in 1996, two years before digital television was introduced.

The company was founded by computer scientist Chris Curry, who had a close relation with Clive Sinclair. His accolades included the first pocket calculator, designing the BBC computer and early interactive television systems. Before setting up OKTV, he set up General Information Services, which underlay the service. His company, which shared the same name as the service, aimed at becoming the first commercially viable interactive television service in the world.

== History ==
OKTV was announced on 6 September 1996 by SMG and served two stations from October. The service consisted of headsets manufactured by OKTV, which hoped to distribute 300,000 units to most of Scotland by year-end 1996, and hoped to have one million units by year-end 1997.

In order to obtain a handset, users had to subscribe to OKTV's magazine, which contained programmes details using the technology. The handset was similar to a remote control in size and function. In an initial phase, OKTV-enabled programmes featured competitions, games and opinion polls. These included guesses on who would score a football match's first goal or what would be a soap opera's next major development. Serious fare was reserved for current affairs debates. The first usage for that end supported Scottish and Grampian's Scotland Against Drugs campaign, which included a survey from 405 secondary schools.

OKTV worked with teletext-enabled television sets, the handset and a telephone. The handset was registered to the title holder of the unit. The user held it to a telephone mouthpiece and pressed the unit's red button. The information was coded and sent to the central computer within 20 seconds. OKTV profited from phone calls (50p each) during the process.

SMG was not a shareholder in the OKTV system.

It started in Scotland as a six-month trial before expanding to the ITV network in 1997. The company planned to deliver five million headsets for China, which would become its second market.

OKTV started its services in the SMG regions on 5 October 1996. A spokesperson for Grampian Television said that 1622 handsets were available in the first week, with 3000 more units to be available at the end of its second week. 2000 competition calls were received during the first weekend and the service recorded 2000 calls a day. In addition to the plans for China, it also planned negotiations with Belgium, Canada and Ireland.

In May 1997, OKTV distributed free handsets with the Daily Record and the Scotland in an attempt at boosting its penetration. This led to a monthly boost of 45,000 users.
