= Christopher Curry (businessman) =

British businessman

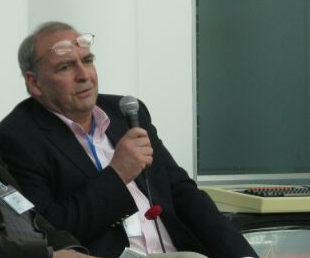
- Curry in 2012
- Born: Christopher Curry; 28 January 1946 (age 80); Cambridge, England
- Occupations: Inventor, Entrepreneur

Christopher Curry (born 28 January 1946) is a British businessman and the co-founder of Acorn Computers, with Hermann Hauser and Andy Hopper. He became a millionaire as a result of Acorn's success.

In his early career days, Curry worked at Pye, Royal Radar Establishment and W.R. Grace Laboratories. Then, in April 1966 he joined Sinclair Radionics where he worked for 13 years. He was involved with their hifi products and their Sinclair C5 electric vehicle. In 1972, he helped Sinclair Radionics to launch its first electronic calculator, the Sinclair Executive. He set up Cambridge Processor Unit Ltd. (CPU) in December 1978. Their first product was the Acorn Microcomputer (later called the System 1).

In 1983, Curry co-founded Redwood Publishing with Michael Potter and Christopher Ward, and they bought the Acorn User title. In 1985, he founded General Information Systems Ltd (GIS) and remains the director. In 2012, he announced his latest project for GIS, Care with Canary.

== Early life ==
Curry went to school initially in St Neots in Cambridgeshire, then later went to the independent Kimbolton School, also in Cambridgeshire. He gained two A levels, in Maths and Physics. He thought about going to university at the University of Southampton, but was keener to be earning some money whilst learning.

== Early career ==
Curry joined Pye in Cambridge in 1964. He stayed for a few months, then left for the Royal Radar Establishment in Worcestershire. He worked on the radar for the proposed BAC TSR-2. The RRE had been the site of many technological advances such as the integrated circuit in 1952. He stayed for nine months. He moved to the W.R. Grace Laboratories, run by ITT, and stayed for six months.

== Sinclair Radionics ==
In April 1966, Curry joined Sinclair Radionics, a company founded by Clive Sinclair in 1961. Curry was to play an important role in getting Sinclair interested in both calculators and computers in his thirteen years with the company.

Curry was at first involved with Sinclair's hifi products, which included amplifiers and speakers, and he also worked on Sinclair's electric vehicle, a project that would turn into the C5 some years later.

In 1972, Sinclair Radionics launched its first electronic calculator, the Executive, which was considerably smaller than its competitors since it used hearing-aid-sized batteries. Curry and Jim Westwood had discovered that it was possible to exploit persistence in the diode displays and memory and introduced a timer that removed the power from these components for most of the time. This discovery dramatically improved the lasting-power of the batteries.

Until 1976 Sinclair Radionics had enjoyed 15 years of strong turnover and profit growth. However, the company sustained losses related to difficulties with chip supplies for the Black Watch. As a result, there were insufficient internal funds available for the final stages of the pocket TV project Sinclair had been working on for some 10 years. In August 1976 the National Enterprise Board (NEB) provided £650,000 in return for 43 per cent stake in Sinclair Radionics. Sinclair did not like sharing control of his company. Thus, he converted a company he had purchased in 1973, Ablesdeal Ltd, into Westminster Mail Order Ltd, which was itself renamed to Sinclair Instrument Ltd. In this way, he maintained control of his most important projects.

== Science of Cambridge ==
Shortly after the NEB took control Sinclair encouraged Curry to leave Sinclair Radionics to get Sinclair Instruments off the ground. Curry borrowed some money and rented offices at 6 King's Parade, Cambridge. To raise cash, Sinclair Instruments released the Wrist Calculator, designed by John Pemberton, in February 1977. The product was successful, selling 15,000 units.

In July 1977, the company was renamed to Science of Cambridge Ltd. Around the same time Ian Williamson showed Curry a prototype computer based around a National Semiconductor SC/MP and some parts scavenged from a Sinclair Cambridge calculator. Curry was impressed and encouraged Sinclair to adopt this as a product; an agreement was reached with Williamson but no contract was ever signed: Nat Semi had offered to redesign the project so that it used only their components and they also offered to manufacture the boards.

Curry took Nat Semi up on its offer and in June 1978 Science of Cambridge launched a microcomputer kit (marketed as the MK14) based around the National SC/MP chip. Curry wanted to further develop the MK14 but Sinclair was working on the NewBrain. Sinclair's reluctance to develop the MK14 led Curry to consider his options. Throughout the MK14 project he had been discussing it with his friend, physics researcher Hermann Hauser, who had also helped by seeking out advice from the many computer experts on hand in Cambridge University.

== Cambridge Processor Unit Ltd ==
Curry and Hauser had become increasingly interested in the idea of selling their own computers and so, on 5 December 1978, they set up Cambridge Processor Unit Ltd (CPU). Their first customer was Ace Coin Equipment Ltd, who needed controllers for their fruit machines. Hauser and Curry recruited Steve Furber - at the time a Cambridge PhD student who was closely involved with local amateur computer groups - to design the device. Furber would go on to become a key figure at Acorn - leading the design of the BBC Micro (along with Sophie Wilson), and later on the ARM microprocessor.

== Acorn Computer ==
The Acorn Microcomputer (later to be called the System 1) was launched as the first product of a new company, Acorn Computers Ltd, founded in March 1979.

After becoming a millionaire as a result of Acorn's success with the BBC Micro project, in 1983 Curry co-founded Redwood Publishing with Michael Potter (former publisher of advertising trade weekly Campaign) and Christopher Ward (former editor of the Daily Express newspaper). The company bought the Acorn User title.

== GIS ==
At the time of the Olivetti takeover of Acorn in 1985 Curry founded General Information Systems Ltd (GIS), based on Acorn's Communications Group, and he remains a director.

GIS specialises in Smart Card technologies for access control and electronic money. In 2012 he announced his latest project with GIS, Care with Canary, a wireless sensor system that allows family members to remotely monitor relatives living alone and triggers alerts.

== See also ==
- Micro Men

== Bibliography ==
- Lloyd, Tom (1984). Dinosaur & Co.: Studies in Corporate Evolution. London: Routledge and Keegan Paul.
- Penny, R. K. (1986). Developing a Philosophy for Engineering. Cape Town: University of Cape Town.
- Perry, James (1985). "Britain's Sir Clive Sinclair Keeps Bouncing Back With New Inventions." The Wall Street Journal. 6 June.
- Pesola, Maija (2005). "The Fertile Soil of Silicon Fen." Financial Times. 9 February.
