= Oxford Universal =

Oxford Universal may refer to:

- Oxford Universal Dictionary, a dictionary
- Sinclair Oxford Universal, an electronic calculator
