= Black Watch (wristwatch) =

1975 electronic watch

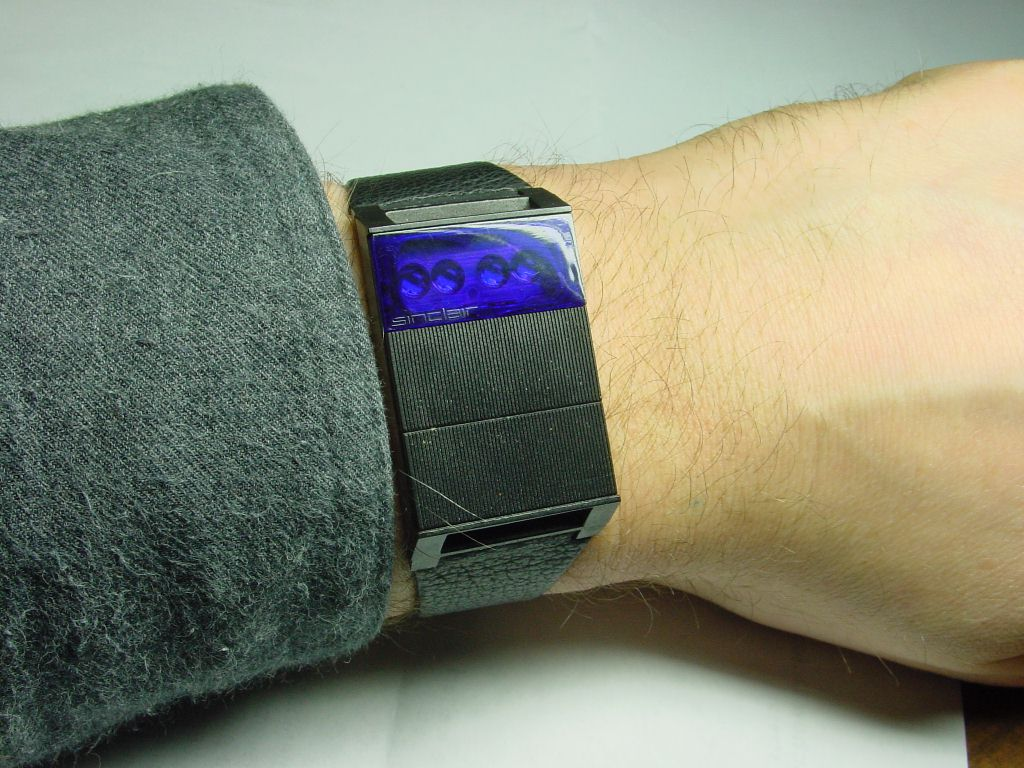
A Black Watch

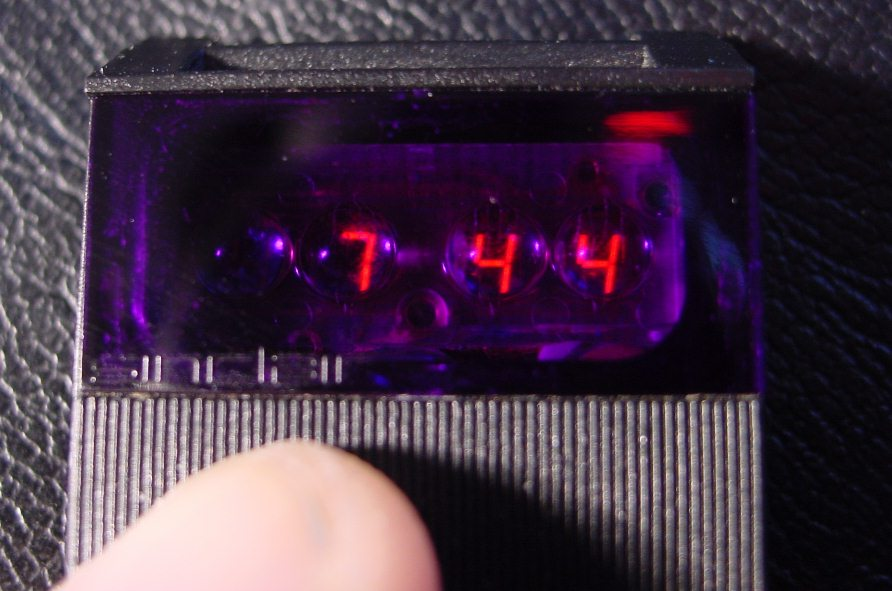
A user operating a Black Watch

The Black Watch is an electronic wristwatch launched in September 1975 by Sinclair Radionics. It cost £24.95 ready-built, but was also available for £17.95, as a kit. These prices are equivalent to around £170 and £120 respectively in 2025, when adjusted for inflation.

The Black Watch was supplied with a plastic band as standard, with a black stainless steel bracelet available as an extra at £2.00.

== Design ==
The Black Watch was equipped with a red light emitting diode display, which illuminated only when the watchcase's surface was pressed; pressing one part of the case displayed hours and minutes, pressing another displayed minutes and seconds. The Black Watch was later available in grey and white, with these versions also having a date function.

The product was beset by technical problems, including short battery life, variable accuracy and a very sensitive integrated circuit which could be rendered useless by static shock. In spite of this, Sinclair's advertising still claimed:

If that sounds technical, think of the outcome: a watch with no moving parts, a watch with nothing to go wrong, a watch which gives accuracy never achievable by the most precise mechanical engineering.

== Reception ==
The watch suffered from serious inherent design flaws. These included the batteries only having a 10-day life and being difficult to replace. This was despite advertisement claims that the batteries lasted a year. The quartz crystal was temperature-sensitive, causing the watch to run at different speeds according to the ambient temperature. The LED display brightness was rather weak, making it difficult to read in well-lit environments. The case switches were unreliable, as were the clips that were intended to hold the plastic case together. The kit version was found to be very difficult for hobbyists to assemble.

A large number of watches were returned for repair or replacement. This completely overwhelmed Sinclair's customer service department, which still had a backlog of watches awaiting repair two years later. The watch was a commercial disaster for the company, which made a loss of £355,000 for 1975-6 on a turnover of £5.6m (in 2025, when adjusted for inflation equivalent to a loss of £2,390,000 on a turnover of £37,740,000). But for a government subsidy, the company would have been bankrupted.

After the failure of the watch, Sinclair Radionics had a stockpile of unsold and faulty watches. To make use of this, the company released the Microquartz car clock in November 1977; this was simply a watch circuit in a different case and intended to be attached to the dashboard of a car. The new case resolved some of the watch's faults and the product sold reasonably well.
