= Jim Westwood =

Jim Westwood is the former chief engineer who worked at Sinclair Research Ltd in the 1980s, starting at the company in 1963. Westwood was the technical mastermind behind many of Sinclair's products and worked there for more than twenty years.

Sir Clive Sinclair and Westwood shared a connection even before they met when Westwood had previously worked at an electronics store in London which was owned by Bernard Babani, Sinclair's publisher. This gave Westwood a good degree of familiarity with Sinclair's designs, which prompted him to join Sinclair's fledgling company, Sinclair Radionics. Westwood subsequently had a hand in most of the company's products, including the calculators, audio equipment, ZX Spectrum computers and TV80.

He is still designing hardware for Amino Communications, and is a partner in Cambridge Electronics Consultancy.

Colin Michael Carmichael plays Westwood in the 2009 BBC television movie Micro Men. Westwood also had a cameo in the movie.

== Books ==
- Adamson, Ian; Kennedy, Richard (1986). Sinclair and the "Sunrise" Technology. London: Penguin Books. 224 pp. ISBN 0-14-008774-5.
- Dale, Rodney (1985). The Sinclair Story. London: Duckworth. 184 pp. ISBN 0-7156-1901-2.
