= Sinclair President =

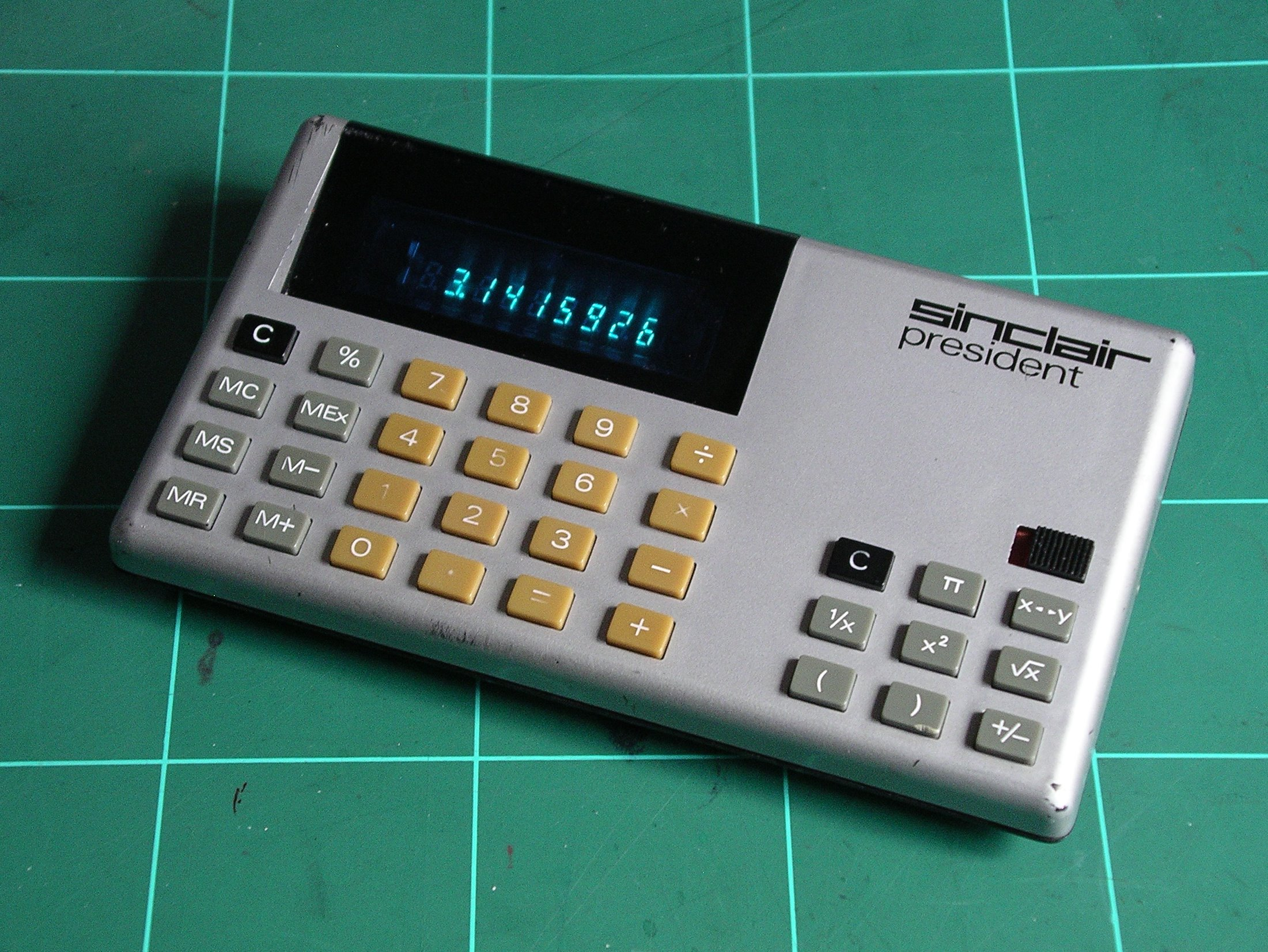
- A Sinclair President calculator (on a grid of 5cm squares)
- Manufacturer: Radofin
- Introduced: early 1978
- Design firm: Sinclair Radionics
- Cost: £17.95

Calculator
- Display type: Vacuum fluorescent display
- Display size: 8 digits

CPU
- Processor: National Semiconductor MM57134ENW/M (President) General Instrument CF-599 (President Scientific)

Other
- Power supply: 2x AA batteries
- Dimensions: 160 by 94 by 28 millimetres (6.3 in × 3.7 in × 1.1 in)

The Sinclair President is a calculator released by Sinclair Radionics in early 1978. There were two models, the President and the President Scientific. They were among the last calculators produced by Sinclair, and their large size was in contrast to the smaller, earlier models, like the Sinclair Executive, which made the company famous. The President models were related to the Sporting Life SETTLER, a calculator designed specifically for betting shops.

== History ==
The calculator was launched in early 1978, at the price of £17.95. It was the only Sinclair calculator not made in England but instead made in Hong Kong by Radofin. Competition in the calculator market was by this point fierce, and the Sinclair did not fare well against cheaper Japanese calculators with more efficient liquid-crystal displays. The silver paint used was of poor quality and was notorious for wearing off.

== Design ==
Both models were the same size, and intended for desktop use, being slightly too large to be readily portable at 160 by 94 by 28 millimetres (6.3 in × 3.7 in × 1.1 in). Power was supplied by two AA batteries. The screens were eight-digit vacuum fluorescent displays, which resulted in a higher power consumption than a calculator with a liquid-crystal display.

The President, as well as addition, subtraction, multiplication and division, had percentage, memory, square root and square functions. It was powered by a National Semiconductor MM57134ENW/M integrated circuit. The President Scientific added logarithmic and trigonometric functions and was powered by a General Instrument CF-599.

== Sporting Life Settler ==
The Sporting Life SETTLER was a calculator designed for betting shops, with development sponsored by Sporting Life. Due to the increased pressure on the calculator market, a number of calculators were produced for a specific purpose, where there was less competition. The Settler had National Semiconductor DS8881N and MM5799NBX/N chips, and was slightly larger than the President, at 163 by 93 by 29 millimetres (6.4 in × 3.7 in × 1.1 in). It was also produced in Hong Kong by Radofin.
