= Sinclair Cambridge =

Pocket calculator

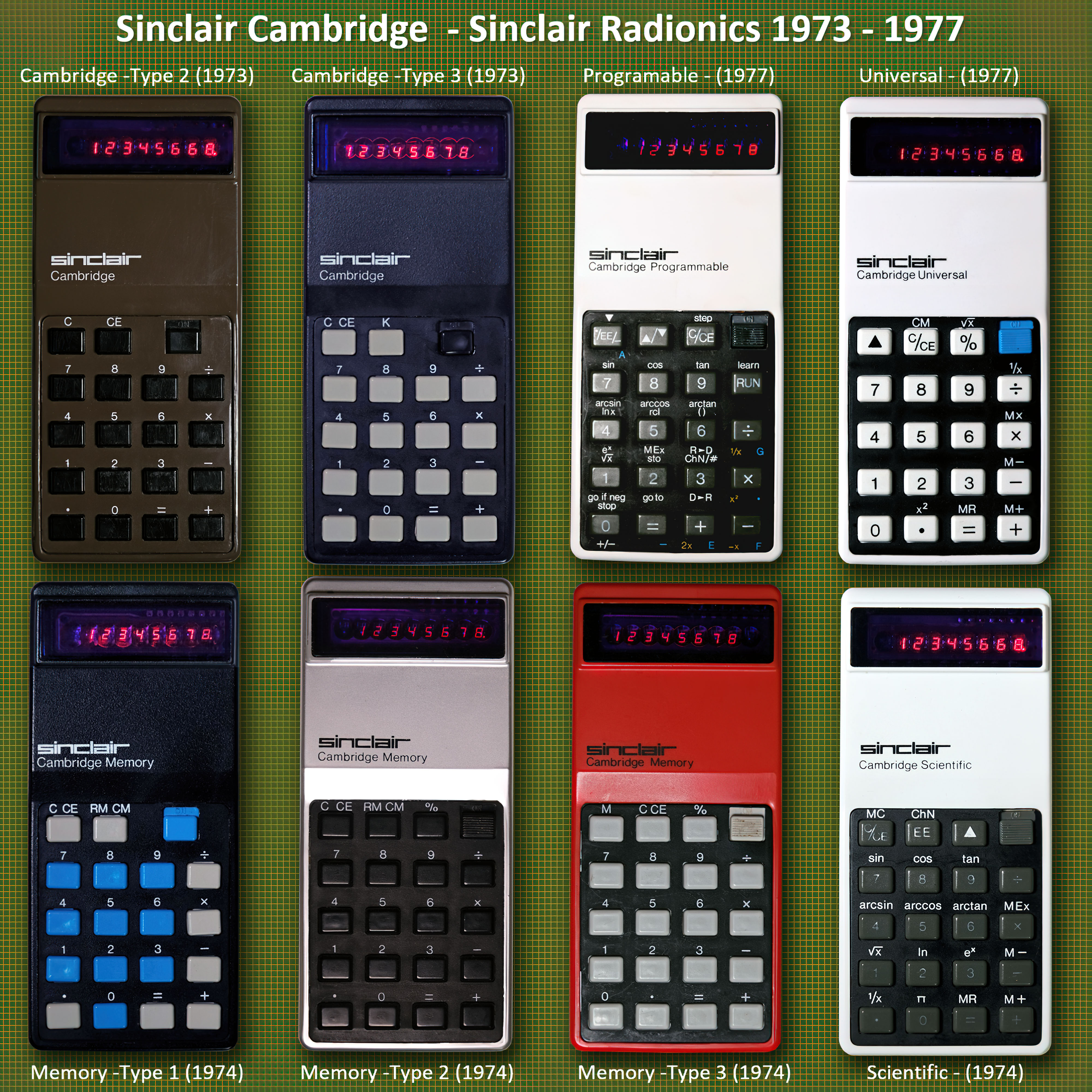
- Various models of the Sinclair Cambridge
- Manufacturer: Sinclair Radionics
- Introduced: 1973
- Predecessor: Sinclair Executive
- Cost: £43.95

Calculator
- Display type: Light-emitting diode
- Display size: 8 digit

Other
- Power supply: 4x AAA batteries
- Dimensions: 50 by 111 by 28 millimetres (2.0 in × 4.4 in × 1.1 in)

The Sinclair Cambridge was a pocket-sized calculator introduced in August 1973 by Sinclair Radionics. It was available both in kit form to be assembled by the purchaser, or assembled prior to purchase. The range ultimately comprised seven models, the original "four-function" Cambridge – which carried out the four basic mathematical functions of addition, subtraction, multiplication, and division – being followed by the Cambridge Scientific, Cambridge Memory, two versions of Cambridge Memory %, Cambridge Scientific Programmable and Cambridge Universal.

The Sinclair calculators were successful because they were far cheaper than the competition; however, their design led to slow and less accurate computations of transcendental functions (maximum three decimal places of accuracy).

== History ==
The Cambridge had been preceded by the Sinclair Executive, Sinclair's first pocket calculator, in September 1972. At the time, the Executive was smaller and noticeably thinner than any of its competitors, at 56 by 138 by 9 millimetres (2.20 in × 5.43 in × 0.35 in), fitting easily into a shirt pocket.

A major factor in the Cambridge's success was its low price; when launched in August 1973, it sold for £32.95 (£29.95 + VAT) fully assembled or £27.45 (£24.95 + VAT) as a kit. An extensive manual explained how to calculate functions such as trigonometry, nth root extraction and compound interest on the device. In October 1974, according to a newspaper advertisement, the type 3 could be bought in the United Kingdom by mail order for £16.95 (including VAT & Post & Packing).

== Design ==
The Cambridge was extremely small for a calculator of the time: it weighed less than 3.5 ounces (99 g) and measured 50 by 111 by 28 millimetres (2.0 in × 4.4 in × 1.1 in). Power was supplied by four AAA batteries.

The use of cheap components was an important contributor to the unit's cost. A common defect was failure of the switch contacts, making it impossible to switch the calculator off. Due to the use of contacts made of nickel coated with tin, rather than gold, an oxide layer would be smeared across the insulating barrier after repeatedly using the switch.

Numbers were displayed on the 8-digit LED display (made by National Semiconductor) in scientific format with a 5-digit mantissa and 2-digit exponent. On later scientific variants the power draw for the display required a larger PP3 battery, creating a bulge in the lower rear casing of the appliance.

== Variants ==
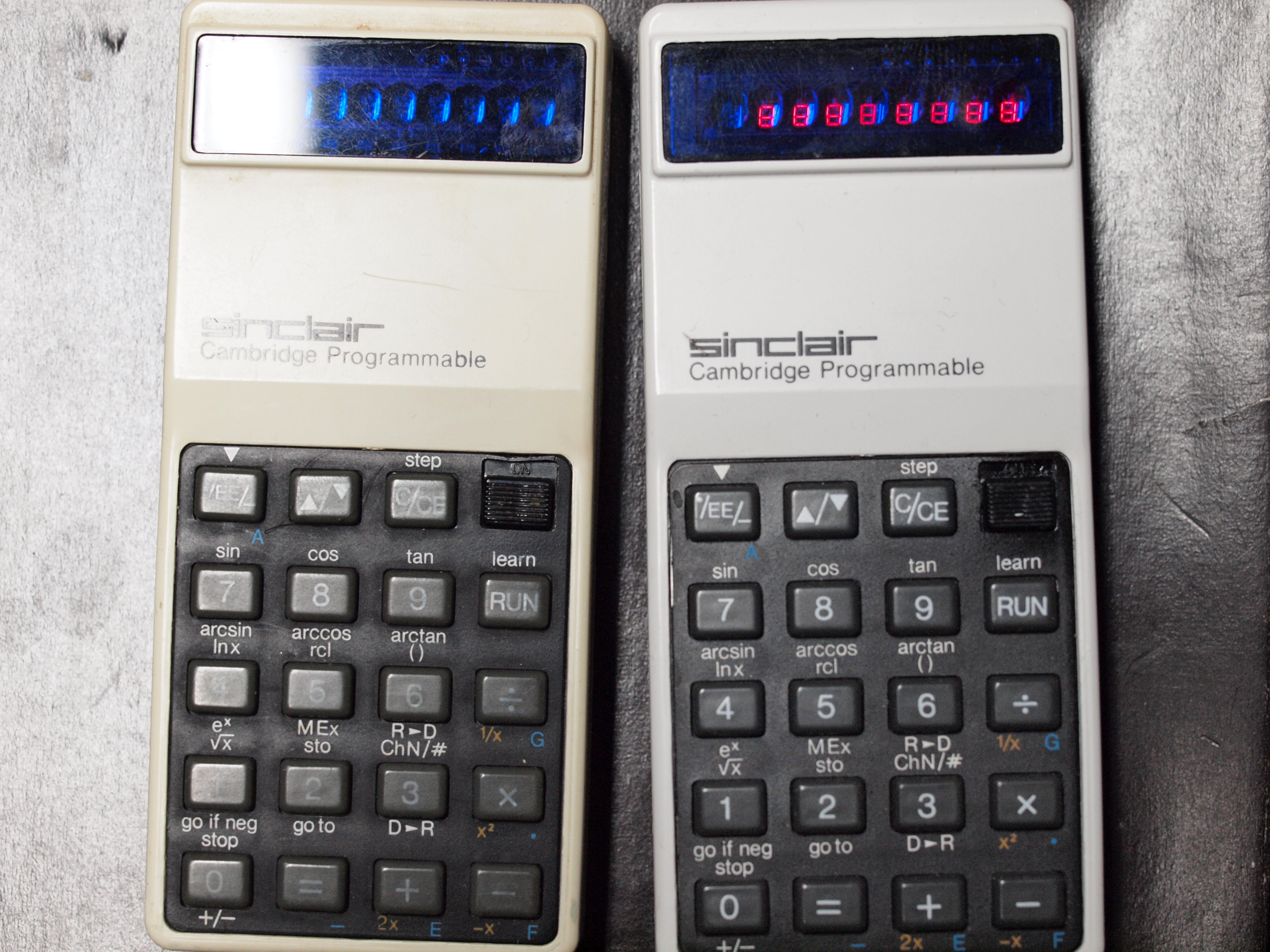
Sinclair Cambridge Programmable

A later model, the Sinclair Cambridge Scientific, was launched in March 1974 at a price of £49.95 (£5 cheaper than its nearest rival from Hewlett-Packard). As the name suggests, it was a development of the Cambridge, using the same case, with the addition of some common scientific functions (sin, cos, tan, etc.).

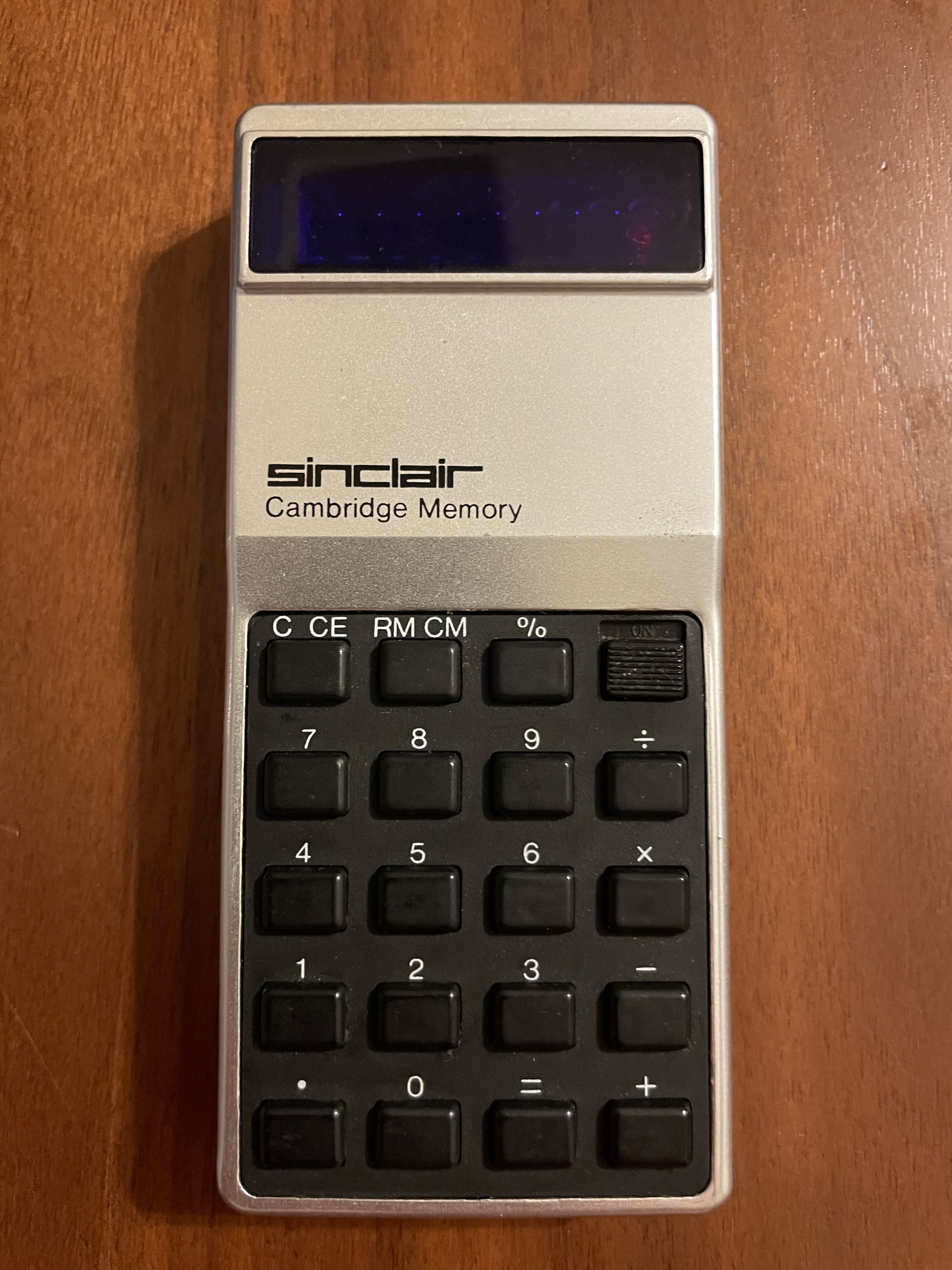
Sinclair Cambridge Memory

The other calculators in the range were the Cambridge Memory, Cambridge Memory % (which came in two different versions), Cambridge Programmable (marketed in the United States as the Radio Shack EC-4001), Cambridge Scientific, Cambridge Scientific Programmable and Cambridge Universal.

The Cambridge Programmable (sold in the U.S as the Radio Shack EC-4001) was released in 1975. It lacked accuracy in many of its scientific functions, some yielding only four significant digits. It featured a single memory register and a limit of 36 program steps, along with a conditional jump instruction. The Programmable came with a program library consisting of four books, covering general functions, finance & statistics, mathematics, physics & engineering and electronics.

The Cambridge Programmable was superseded by the Sinclair Enterprise, which allowed 80 program steps.

== Emulator ==
Veniamin Ilmer transcribed the ROM of the chip die from the Sinclair Cambridge Type 2, and in 2024 built an emulator using it.

== Sources ==
- Dale, Rodney (1985). The Sinclair Story. Duckworth. ISBN 9780715619018.
