= Nigel Searle =

Former managing director of Sinclair Research

Nigel Searle is the former managing director of Sinclair Research Ltd, and one of the company's longest-serving employees. He joined Sinclair Radionics in 1973, and for most of the 1970s, Searle worked for Sinclair in the United States to promote the company's calculators and other products. In 1977, with Sinclair in financial trouble, Searle left the company. He rejoined in 1979 when Sir Clive Sinclair formed Science of Cambridge (later renamed Sinclair Research) and continued to work from the US, successfully promoting the ZX80 and ZX81 personal computers. In spring 1982, he moved back to the United Kingdom as Sinclair's managing director, a post he retained until 1986 when Amstrad took over the company's computer business.

Derek Riddell portrayed Searle in the 2009 BBC television movie Micro Men.

== External links and references ==
- Planet Sinclair - Nigel Searle
- Sinclair User magazine, Plotting a course for growth, June 1982
- Sinclair User magazine, Carrying memory in your pocket, December 1982
- Your Spectrum magazine Circe, March 1984 (interview)
- Reversing Sinclair's amazing 1974 calculator hack - half the ROM of the HP-35
