= Sinclair Enterprise =

Calculator manufactured by Sinclair Radionics

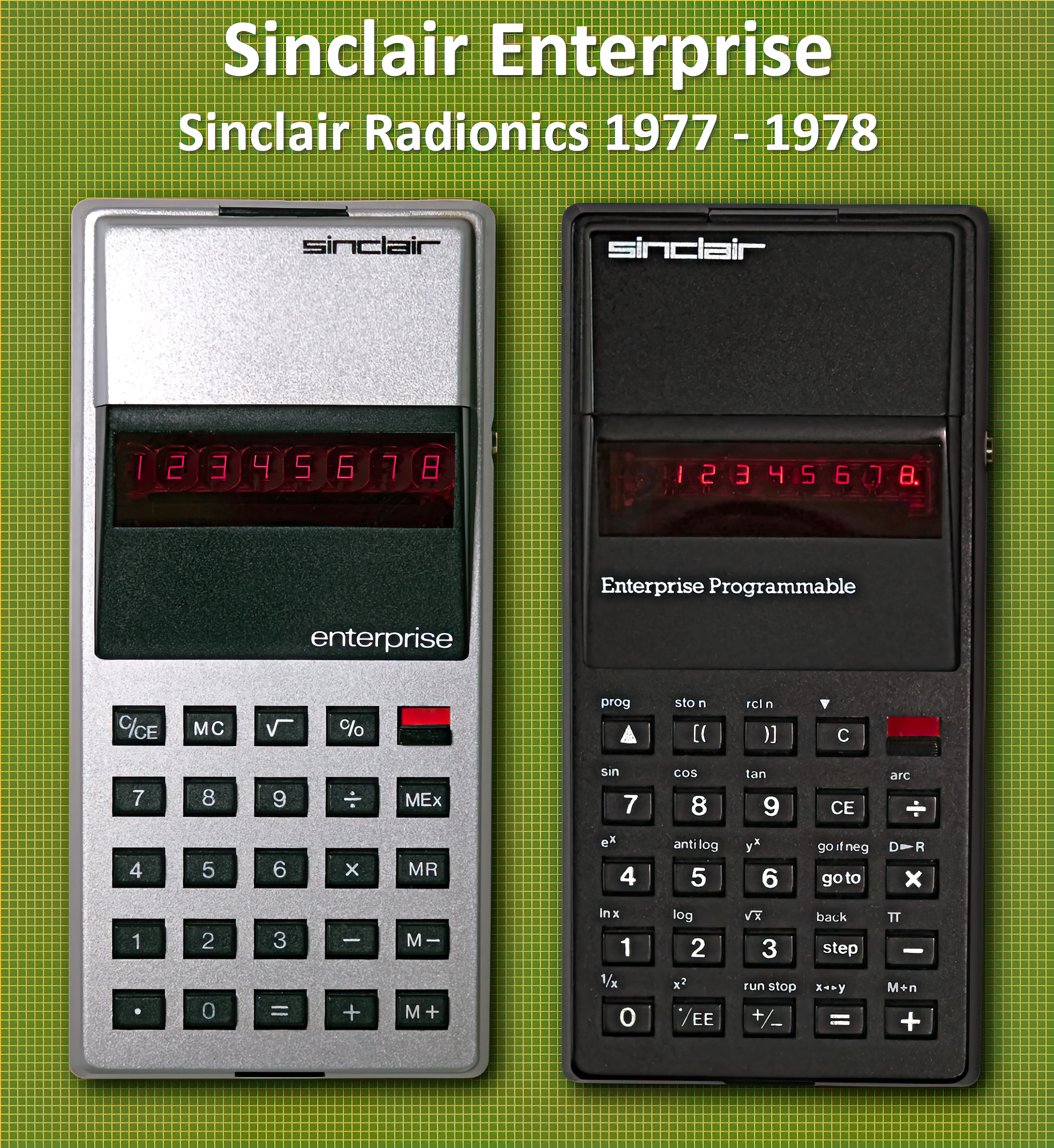
- Sinclair Enterprise Calculators
- Introduced: 1977
- Discontinued: 1978
- Design firm: Sinclair Radionics

Calculator
- Display type: Light-emitting diode
- Display size: 8 digits

CPU
- Processor: General Instruments C689G

Other
- Power supply: 9V PP3 battery
- Weight: 110g
- Dimensions: 65 by 135 by 23 millimetres (2.6 in × 5.3 in × 0.9 in)

The Sinclair Enterprise was a calculator introduced in 1977 by Sinclair Radionics.

== History ==
The Enterprise calculator was introduced in October 1977 by Sinclair Radionics, with the Enterprise Programmable following in July 1978. At that time, Sinclair was being financially assisted by the United Kingdom government through the National Enterprise Board, which the calculator's name references. Neither calculator was a great success and they ended up being sold at a loss.

== Sources ==
- Dale, Rodney (1985). The Sinclair Story. Duckworth. ISBN 9780715619018.
