= Sinclair Wrist Calculator =

Wrist-worn calculator introduced in 1977

- Introduced: February 1977
- Design firm: Sinclair Instrument

Calculator
- Display type: Light-emitting diode
- Display size: 8 digits

CPU
- Processor: Mostek MK50321N

Other
- Power supply: 8.1V
- Dimensions: 47 by 45 by 18 millimetres (1.85 in × 1.77 in × 0.71 in)

The Sinclair Wrist Calculator was a wrist-worn calculator produced by Sinclair Instrument and introduced in 1977.

== History ==
The Wrist Calculator was launched in February 1977 by Sinclair Instrument, a company established in parallel to Sinclair Radionics when the latter started to encounter financial difficulties.

It was only available as a mail-order kit, and cost around £11. Despite the difficulty in assembling the kit due to the small size of the parts and their variability in specification, 10,000 were sold around the world. 20,000 were exported to the United States, but most went unsold and were returned to Sinclair. It was described as an "utter dud" and "impossible-to-build" by the journal International Design.

== Design ==
The design used 10 keys, with a three-position switch to select the correct function. The switch was held to the left to access the functions to the left above the keys, and to the right to get the functions to the right above the keys. In the centre position it would enter the numbers on the keys.

It used normal algebraic logic, as opposed to the reverse Polish notation employed on some Sinclair calculators.
