= Sinclair Oxford =

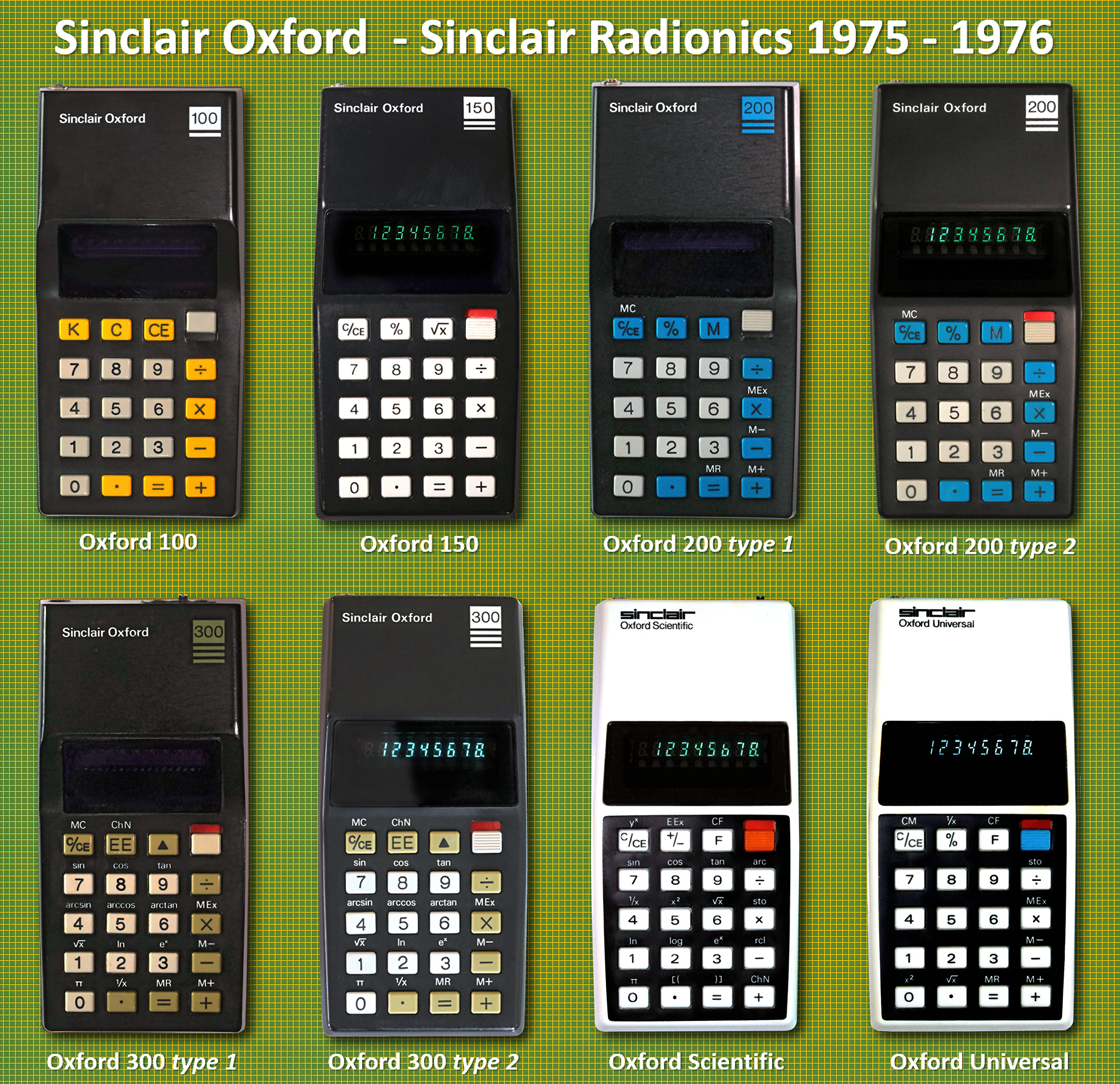
- Sinclair Oxford calculators
- Type: Scientific calculator
- Manufacturer: Sinclair Radionics
- Introduced: Spring 1975
- Discontinued: 1976

Calculator
- Display type: Light-emitting diode/ Vacuum fluorescent display (Type 1s used the LED and Type 2s the VFD)
- Display size: 8 digits

Other
- Power supply: PP3 battery
- Weight: 138 grams (Oxford 300 excluding batteries)
- Dimensions: 73 by 155 by 34 millimetres (2.9 in × 6.1 in × 1.3 in)

Sinclair Oxford was a range of low-cost scientific calculators manufactured and sold by Sinclair Radionics in England from 1975 until 1976.

== History ==
In November 1974, Gillette wanted to enter the consumer electronics market, so consulted Sinclair, who designed for them the Gillette GPA. Whilst the GPA was released, Gillette put the product on hold after a short time due to economic and pricing uncertainties. Sinclair would use the GPA design for the Oxford range, the development and tooling of which had been paid for by Gillette.

The first model was the Oxford 100, launched in Spring 1975 for £12.95 (all prices exclude VAT); and essentially the same as the GPA. Both the Gillette GPA and Oxford 100 models used 8 digit displays with red light-emitting diodes (LEDs), 4 functions, 9 volt PP3 batteries, and measured 73 by 155 by 34 millimetres (2.9 in × 6.1 in × 1.3 in).

== Models ==
All the Oxford models were similar in appearance; the 150 was introduced in 1975 introducing the ability to calculate percentages and square roots. The Oxford 200 included memory and sold for £19.95. The Oxford 300 was a scientific model with a limited number of functions (such as sin, cos, tan), which sold for £29.95, much lower than the competition. The last two models, the Oxford Scientific (1976) and Oxford Universal were the most advanced of the range.

The high power consumption of the calculators, which drew 40 mA while in operation, four times the recommended limit of the batteries, meant a short battery life. Computer Digest recommended using a much larger PP9 battery, but that meant losing the portability of the calculator.
