= Sinclair Radionics =

British electronics manufacturer (1961–1979)

Sinclair Radionics Ltd
- Company type: Limited company
- Industry: Electronics, hi-fi equipment
- Founded: Cambridge, England (1961; 65 years ago)
- Fate: Renamed Sinclair Electronics Ltd. (September 1979; 46 years ago)
- Key people: Sir Clive Sinclair, Founder, Nigel Searle
- Products: Sinclair Executive, Sinclair Scientific, Black Watch
- Revenue: £6.3 million GBP (1975)

Sinclair Radionics Ltd was a company founded by Sir Clive Sinclair in Cambridge, England which developed hi-fi products, radios, calculators and scientific instruments.

== History ==
After raising funds to start the business by writing articles for Practical Wireless magazine, and borrowing £50, Clive Sinclair founded Sinclair Radionics Ltd. on 25 July 1961. Sinclair initially worked alone in the evenings in a room in London (he was still a technical journalist during the day), selling radio kits by mail order.

=== Radios and Hi-Fi ===
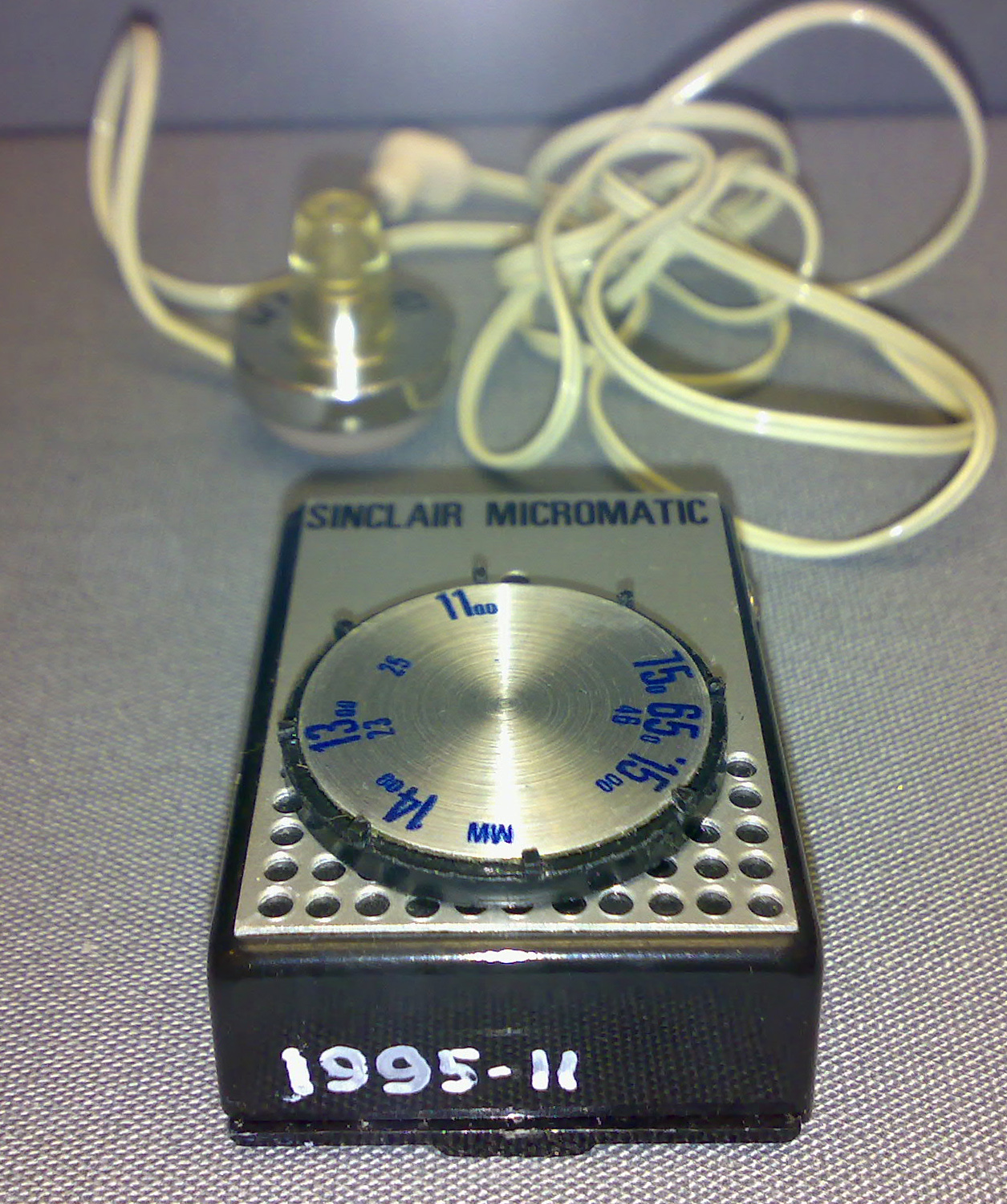
The Sinclair Micromatic pocket radio

Radionics initially developed hi-fi equipment; it released its first product, the Sinclair Micro-amplifier, in December 1962. The assembly and distribution of this product were contracted to Cambridge Consultants. In 1963 Sinclair Radionics introduced their first radio, the "Sinclair Slimline", in kit form at forty-nine shillings and sixpence (£2.47½).

A year later, in 1964, Sinclair released the "X-10" amplifier, one of the first commercial Class-D amplifiers. The same year, Sinclair released the "Micro-6", matchbox-size radio, which the company claimed was the "world's smallest radio"—it could also be worn on your wrist with the "Transrista".

In 1965 the "Micro-FM" debuted as "the world's first pocket-size FM tuner-receiver", but it was unsuccessful due to technical difficulties. Despite problems, illegal clones were produced in the far east. Sinclair's final 1960s radio kit was the 1967 "Micromatic", billed as "the world's smallest radio" like Sinclair's earlier radios. The "Micromatic" was a reasonable success and was sold until 1971. In May 1971 Sinclair Radionics made £85,000 profit on £563,000 turnover; the following year profit increased to £97,000 on turnover of £761,000.

In 1966, Sinclair Radionics re-entered the hi-fi market with the "Stereo 25", a low-cost pre-amp control system. Production was halted in 1968 due to lack of transistors, which had been purchased in 1964 as rejects from other manufacturers. In 1969 it was replaced by the "Stereo Sixty". This soon became Sinclair's most successful audio product, being the second product of the "Project 60" range. The "Project 60" products sold well and were supplemented by the "Project 605" kit in 1972. It was eventually superseded by the more advanced "Project 80" kit in 1974. In May 1973 Sinclair Radionics generated £1.8 million turnover. The last Sinclair Radionics hi-fi product was the System 4000, in 1974.

Another Sinclair Radionics product that was introduced in 1964 and failed was the first class D amplifier kit rated at 10 watt RMS: a class D switching amplifier that was good in theory but ahead of its time and available technology. The amplifier used low-frequency germanium transistors as pulse width modulators and switches and wrongly relied on the loudspeaker's inductance to filter the class D signal into audio. Often this would short out the output transistors. When it did work the power was far below 10 watts and Sinclair's main advertising venue, Wireless World magazine, was so deluged with complaints that it reportedly refused to take further advertisements from Sinclair.

Sinclair Radionics launched the System 2000 amplifier, FM tuner and loudspeaker in 1968. followed by the System 3000 in 1972.

=== Calculators and test equipment ===
Financial performance of Sinclair Radionics, 1971—1978
Year	Turnover	Profit	Loss	%
1971	?	?	?	?
1972	761,000	97,000	−	13%
1973	1,800,000	?	−	?
1974	4,000,000	240,000	−	6%
1975	6,300,000	45,000	−	1%
1976	5,600,000	?	355,000	N/A
1977	?	?	820,000	N/A
1978	6,390,000	?	1,980,000	N/A

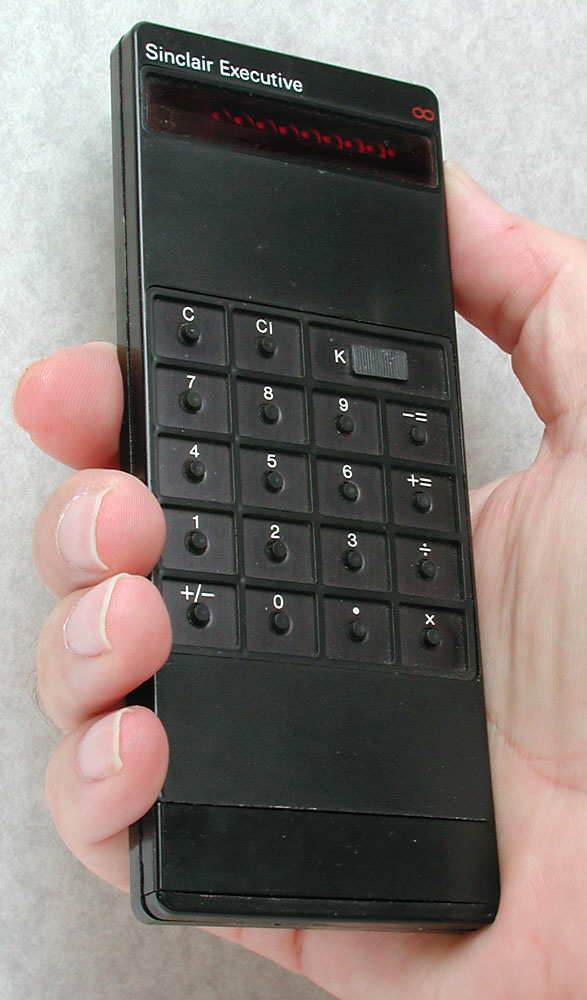
The Sinclair Executive calculator

In 1972, Radionics launched its first electronic calculator, the Executive, which was considerably smaller than its competitors by using hearing-aid-sized batteries. What had made this possible was the discovery that there was considerable latency between the display and memory and that, with the addition of a timer, power could be withheld from these battery-draining components for much of the time, thus greatly extending battery life.

During the majority of the 1970s, Sinclair focused on building the most affordable pocket calculators with the best design. In 1972 Sinclair released the world's first slim-line pocket calculator, the Sinclair Executive, for £79.95. The calculator included only basic maths functions, and the LED display required much power. It is often credited as being the world's first attractively styled calculator that did not require mains power to be used like prior calculators. The Executive was a phenomenal success, earning Sinclair £1.8m in profit. In 1973 the slightly larger Sinclair Cambridge was introduced at a far cheaper price of £29.95 + VAT. A cheaper Executive was also launched shortly after. In addition to expanding the Cambridge range, the Sinclair Scientific was launched in 1975. It was a scientific pocket calculator for the very competitive price of £49.95. In 1977 a revised model, the "Scientific Programmable", was released at £29.95. The Scientific Programmable Mark 2 was later released, reducing the price to £17.22.

In 1975, Sinclair Radionics launched the Oxford range of briefcase calculators. Sinclair also attempted to capture the top-end calculator market with the Sinclair Sovereign, available in plated gold or silver. The calculator was critically acclaimed for its excellent engineering and design and enjoyed short success. Final attempts at the mass-market for calculators, the Sinclair Enterprise and the President, did not sell well.

In 1974, Radionics launched the DM1 digital multimeter. Such scientific instruments were to form a quiet backbone of Radionics business for the rest of its existence. In marked contrast to the rest of the Sinclair range, the instruments gained a reputation for reliable conventionality rather than often unreliable idiosyncrasy.

=== Black Watch ===
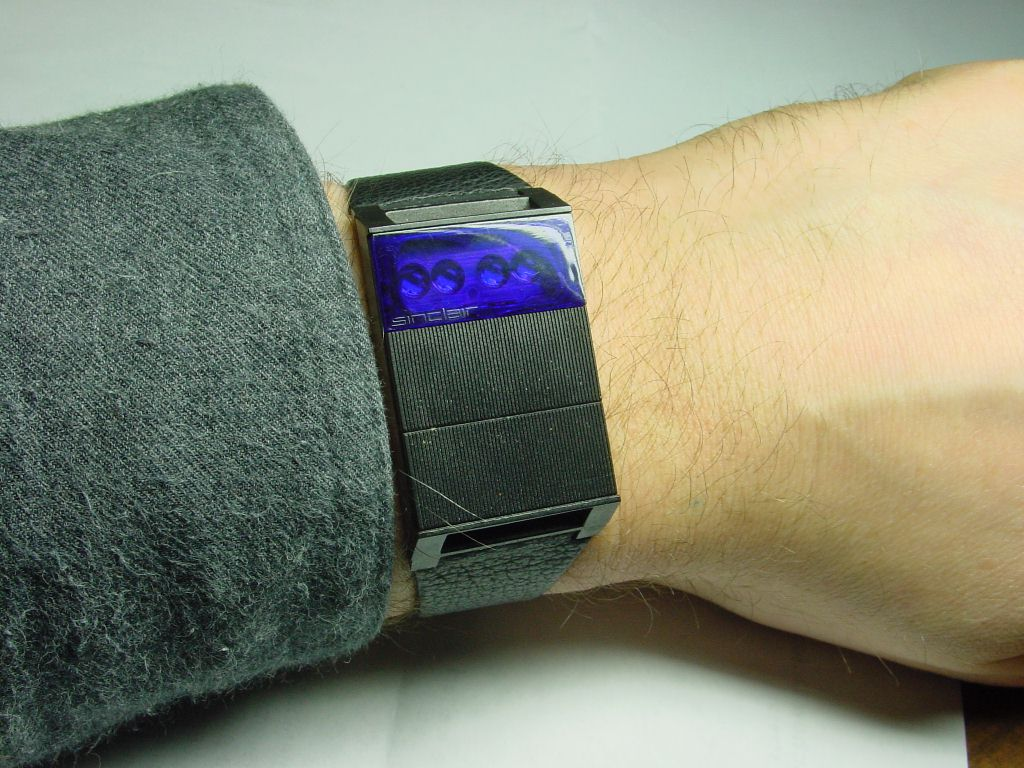
The Sinclair Black Watch

In August 1975, Sinclair introduced the Black Watch digital watch at £17.95 in kit form and £24.95 ready-built, although this wasn't available to buy until January 1976. Including a five-digit LED display, it suffered from technical flaws related to the design of the case, the chip, the battery and accuracy. Not only was the watch unreliable, Radionics was not able to fulfil the orders it had taken. As a result, Radionics made its first loss in the financial year April 1974 – April 1975. The Black Watch fiasco had a devastating effect on Sinclair's finances, and the company would have gone bankrupt had not the Government, through the National Enterprise Board, stepped in to support it.

=== Portable televisions ===
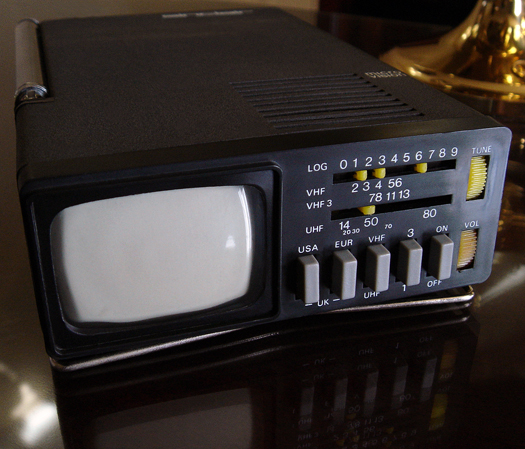
Sinclair MTV-1 television

In 1966, Sinclair Radionics developed a portable television, the "Microvision", but never attempted to sell it because development costs would have been too high based on the complicated design the Microvision used.

In April 1976, the National Enterprise Board bought a 43% stake in Sinclair Radionics for £650,000, and in October the National Research and Development Council agreed to provide £1 million for a revived portable TV project, which was finally launched in January 1977 as the Microvision TV1A and MON1A at £99.95. Supply exceeded demand, and 12,000 units were left unsold until they were sold off cheaply. This resulted in a £480,000 loss for Sinclair. Sir Clive Sinclair was certain that the TV1B model released in 1978 would be more successful, but sales were disappointing.

== Demise ==
In July 1977, the NEB increased its stake in Radionics to 73%. By June 1978 Sinclair Radionics was working on the NewBrain microcomputer project, which was later taken over by Newbury Laboratories.

In May 1979, the NEB announced that it intended to sell Radionics' calculator and TV interests; they were bought by the ESL Bristol group (as Radionic Products Ltd.) and Binatone respectively. In July Clive Sinclair resigned with a £10,000 golden handshake. In September the NEB renamed what was left of Radionics (i.e. the scientific instrument business) as Sinclair Electronics Ltd.; in January 1980 this was changed to Thandar Electronics Ltd. In 1989, Thandar Electronics Ltd merged with Thurlby Electronics Ltd, forming Thurlby Thandar Instruments Ltd. This company now does business under the name Aim and Thurlby Thandar Instruments (Aim-TTi).

== Sinclair Instrument and Science of Cambridge ==
When it became clear that Radionics was failing, Clive Sinclair took steps to ensure that he would be able to continue to pursue his commercial goals: in February 1975, he changed the name of Ablesdeal Ltd. (an off-the-shelf company he bought in September 1973, for just such an eventuality) to Westminster Mail Order Ltd.; this was changed to Sinclair Instrument Ltd. in August 1975.

Finding it inconvenient to share control after the NEB became involved in Radionics, Sinclair encouraged Chris Curry, who had been working for Radionics since 1966, to leave and get Sinclair Instrument up and running.

Sinclair Instrument developed the "Wrist Calculator" to generate cash, which soon became a commercial success selling in surprising figures. In July 1977 Sinclair Instrument Ltd was renamed to Science of Cambridge Ltd. Around about the same time Ian Williamson showed Chris Curry a prototype microcomputer based around a National Semiconductor SC/MP microprocessor and some parts taken from an earlier Sinclair calculator. This was sold as the MK14 microcomputer kit. Science of Cambridge ultimately became Sinclair Research Ltd.
