= Shelf corporation =

Type of business entity

A shelf corporation, shelf company, or aged corporation is a company or corporation that has had no activity. It was created and left with no activity – metaphorically put on the "shelf" to "age". The company can then be sold to a person or group of persons who wish to start a company without going through all the procedures of creating a new one.

== Reasons for buying ==
Common reasons for buying a shelf corporation are to save the time involved in taking the steps to create a new corporation or to gain the opportunity to bid on contracts. Some jurisdictions require that a company be in business for a certain length of time to have this ability.

Other reasons may be to show corporate longevity in order to attract consumers or investors or to gain access to corporate credit.

=== Criticism ===
While previously it may have taken an extended period of time to properly incorporate a business, it is now relatively quick and easy to do so in many countries, including Australia, Canada, the United States, Western Europe, and the United Arab Emirates. A company can be incorporated in as little as a couple of hours in some jurisdictions, and even quicker in places like Australia, where a new company can get registered within 10 minutes.

Additionally, a corporation might end up "on the shelf" because of a bad business history.

The benefits of corporate longevity may not come to fruition if credit bureaus report that a company as being under new management, which effectively "re-ages" the company.

== Market ==
A number of consortia "produce" and sell shelf corporations, promoting the fact that the new buyer can at the same time have a corporation with a long history, and yet have complete control over the establishment of the corporation's board of directors and shareholder profile.

== Examples ==
A Reuters report described Wyoming Corporate Services as an example of a vendor of shelf companies, which were stored in mailboxes labeled as "corporate suites" in the main room of a 1,700-square-foot (160 m^{2}) brick house a few blocks from the Wyoming State Capitol. Over 700 companies were available at prices based on their age, ranging from $5,995 for a six-year-old company to $645 for one aged a few months. Wyoming Corporate Services is one of many similar large scale incorporation businesses, primarily in Delaware, Wyoming, and Nevada due to regulatory considerations.

In Restoration France, new newspapers needed royal permissions to start, but newspapers founded before 1822 could continue printing. The opposition bought the rights to newspapers founded before 1822 and since closed, and resumed printing them.

== See also ==
- Seasoned tradeline
