= Sinclair Executive =

Pocket calculator

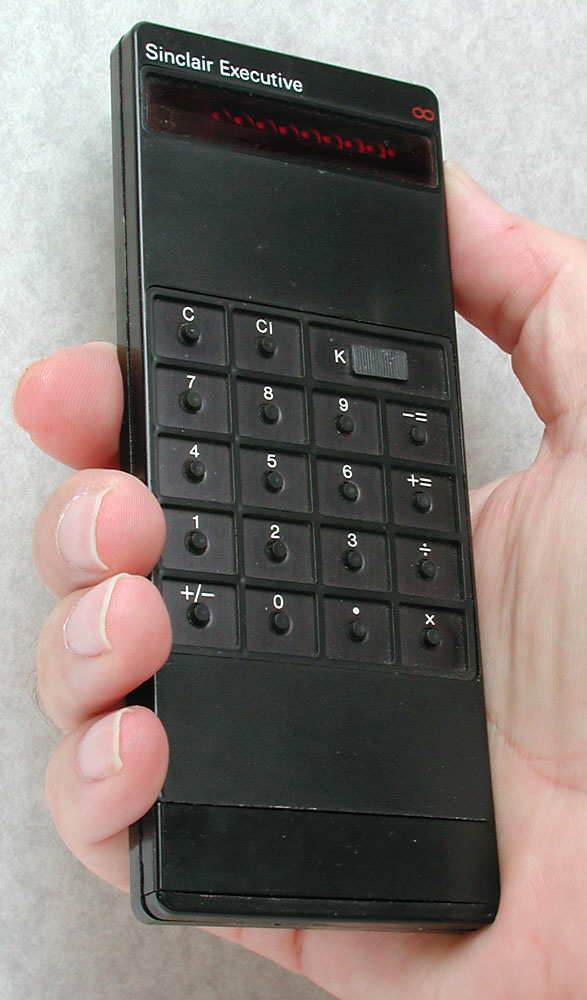
- Sinclair Executive Type 1
- Introduced: September 1972
- Invented by: Clive Sinclair
- Cost: £79.95

Calculator
- Display type: Light-emitting diode
- Display size: 8 digits

CPU
- Processor: Texas Instruments TMS1802NC
- Frequency: 200 kHz

Other
- Power supply: 4 button cells
- Power consumption: 20 milliwatts
- Dimensions: 56 by 138 by 9 millimetres (2.20 in × 5.43 in × 0.35 in)

The Sinclair Executive was the world's first "slimline" pocket calculator, and the first to be produced by Clive Sinclair's company Sinclair Radionics. Introduced in 1972, the calculator was produced in at least two versions with different keyboard markings; a variant called the Sinclair Executive Memory was introduced in 1973.

Its small size was made possible by pulsing current to the Texas Instruments TMS1802 "calculator on a chip" integrated circuit, reducing the power consumption more than tenfold. The Executive was highly successful, making £1.8 million of profit for Sinclair and winning a Design Council Award for Electronics.

== History ==
The Executive was launched in September 1972 at the price of £79.95 plus VAT, equivalent to £950 in 2025 when adjusted for inflation. This was around half the price of comparable calculators, but still twice the average weekly wage. It was the first pocket calculator, and the first to be mass-produced, and its introduction to the market coincided with a number of other companies entering the calculator market.

The entrepreneur Clive Sinclair, reckoning that the market for "executive toys" was not especially sensitive to price, ordered components for 100,000 calculators. The Executive was highly successful, and made £1.8 million profit for his company Sinclair Radionics. It was well received by both domestic and foreign markets, and US$1.5 million worth of Executives were sold in Japan in early 1974 at six times the price of Japanese models. The parts, consisting of the TMS1802 chip, 22 transistors, 50 resistors and 17 capacitors, cost close to £10, compared with a sale price of almost £80. The Executive impressed the engineers at Texas Instruments, who had used the same chip to produce a longer and wider calculator that was over three times as thick and a great deal more expensive. In 1974, sales of the Executive exceeded £2.5 million, and Sinclair was producing 100,000 calculators each month, of which 55% were exported.

A Sinclair Executive purchased by a Russian diplomat exploded in his breast pocket, allegedly leading to an official Soviet investigation. It was found that it had been left on by accident, leading to a drain on the batteries that overheated them until they burst.

== Design ==
The calculator was significantly smaller than any of its competitors, and the first that could easily be carried in a pocket. According to a Sinclair executive quoted in the Financial Times, "one must always bear a packet of cigarettes in mind as the ideal size", possibly a quip on Clive Sinclair's smoking habit. The Executive weighed 2.5 ounces (71 g) and measured 56 by 138 by 9 millimetres (2.20 in × 5.43 in × 0.35 in). The case, designed by Iain Sinclair, was made of black injection-moulded polycarbonate and required flexible glue to hold the two halves together.

Design Magazine described it as "at once a conversation piece, a rich man's plaything and a functional business machine". One example is on display at the Museum of Modern Art in New York City, and the futuristic design earned it the Design Council Award for Electronics in 1973. It was the first calculator designed for aesthetic appeal, and New Scientist described it as "not so much a professional calculator – more a piece of personal jewellery".

=== Functions ===
As well as four-function arithmetic, the Executive could compute squares, reciprocals, and multiply or divide by a fixed constant. The Executive could display results to two, four, or six decimal places, or use a floating decimal point.

=== Microprocessor ===
The calculator was powered by a Texas Instruments TMC1802NC, a metal oxide semiconductor integrated circuit with 7,000 transistors. This circuit normally consumes 350 milliwatts, but by pulsing the power the average draw was reduced to 20 milliwatts. It was discovered that an early prototype continued to work if the batteries were disconnected and then reapplied quickly enough, as the capacitors in the circuit could hold a charge for up to five seconds.

Power is supplied to the chip in 1.7-microsecond pulses as determined by the storage time of a control transistor. An oscillator clock operating at 200 kilohertz during calculations and dropping to 15 kHz between each operation means shut-off time ranges from 3.3 microseconds during calculations to more than 65 microseconds between. The device relies on the capacitance of the chips to store information when there is no power, and 1.7 microseconds proved sufficient for the chip to carry out a single change of state of the electronics. Any calculation can be done in 1,000 such changes. This technique extended battery life to about 20 hours of continuous use with three small hearing-aid batteries, equivalent to about four months of normal usage.

=== Screen ===
The screen was a monolithic seven-segment gallium arsenide light emitting diode display bought from a Canadian firm. The small screen reduced the power consumption and material costs, but it was revised several times in pursuit of lower power consumption, creating reliability problems.

== Successors ==
The Executive Memory was launched in November 1973, with the same dimensions as the original, but with the ability to memorise subtotals from any number of chain calculations. There were at least three versions, including the black and white Type 1, and the Type 2 with a gold keyboard. The Executive Memory sold at the lower price of £24.95.
