= 2D memory access pattern =

#REDIRECT memory access pattern#2D

- To a section: This is a redirect from a topic that does not have its own page to a section of a page on the subject. For redirects to embedded anchors on a page, use {{R to anchor}} instead.
