= MK14 =

Computer kit by Science of Cambridge

Microcomputer Kit 14
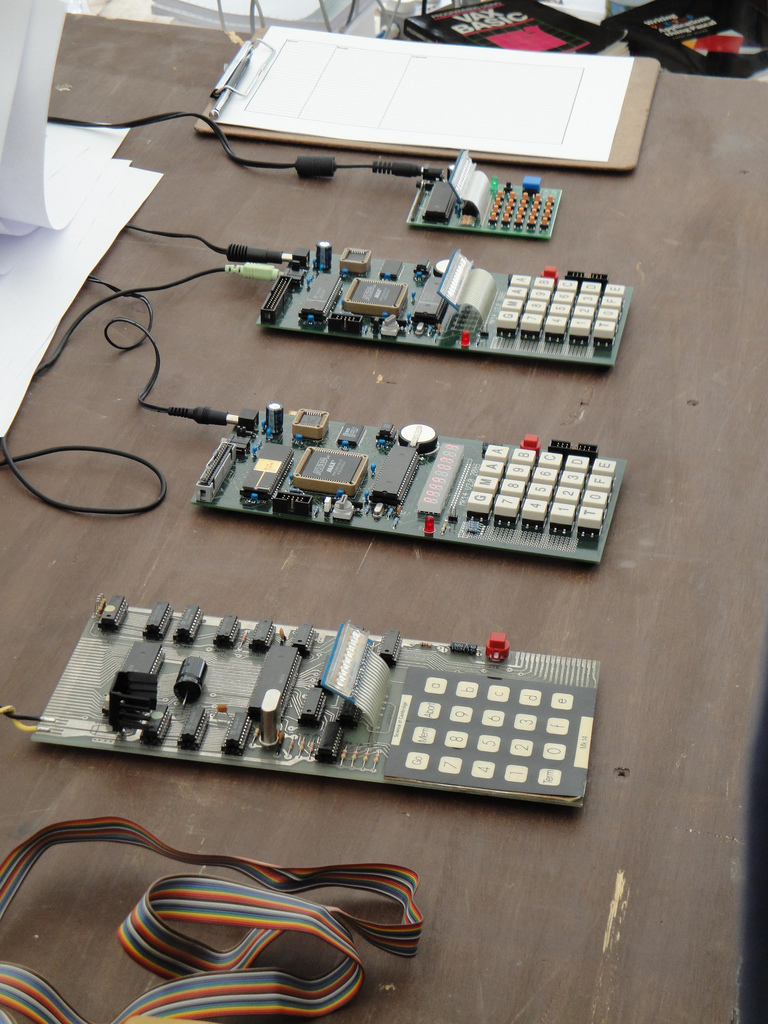
- MK14 (foreground) with modern reproductions behind
- Also known as: MK14
- Manufacturer: Science of Cambridge
- Type: computer kit
- Released: 1977; 49 years ago
- Introductory price: £39.95 GBP (£235; $322 at 2025 prices)
- CPU: National Semiconductor SC/MP (INS8060)
- Memory: 256 bytes of RAM, expandable on-board to 640 bytes and to 2,176 bytes with further expansion; plus 512 bytes of monitor ROM
- Display: 8 or 9 red light-emitting diode (LED) seven segment display
- Input: 20 key keyboard
- Successor: ZX80

The MK14 (Microcomputer Kit 14) was a computer kit sold by Science of Cambridge of the United Kingdom, first introduced in 1977 for £39.95. The price was very low for a complete computer system at the time.

The MK14 used National Semiconductor's INS8060 SC/MP II microprocessor, a low-cost 8-bit processor also used in development, educational and controller-oriented single-board computer systems. The original design was custom, based on a Sinclair calculator as the main input and output device. National Semiconductor offered them the design of National's IntroKit single board computers for free if they agreed to a purchase agreement on the parts, which would be lower than what they could negotiate separately. The original design was dropped in favour of National's offer.

Several memory upgrades were available, increasing RAM from 256 bytes to 640 bytes on board, and to 2,176 bytes with further expansion, as well as a variety of other add-ons.

== History ==
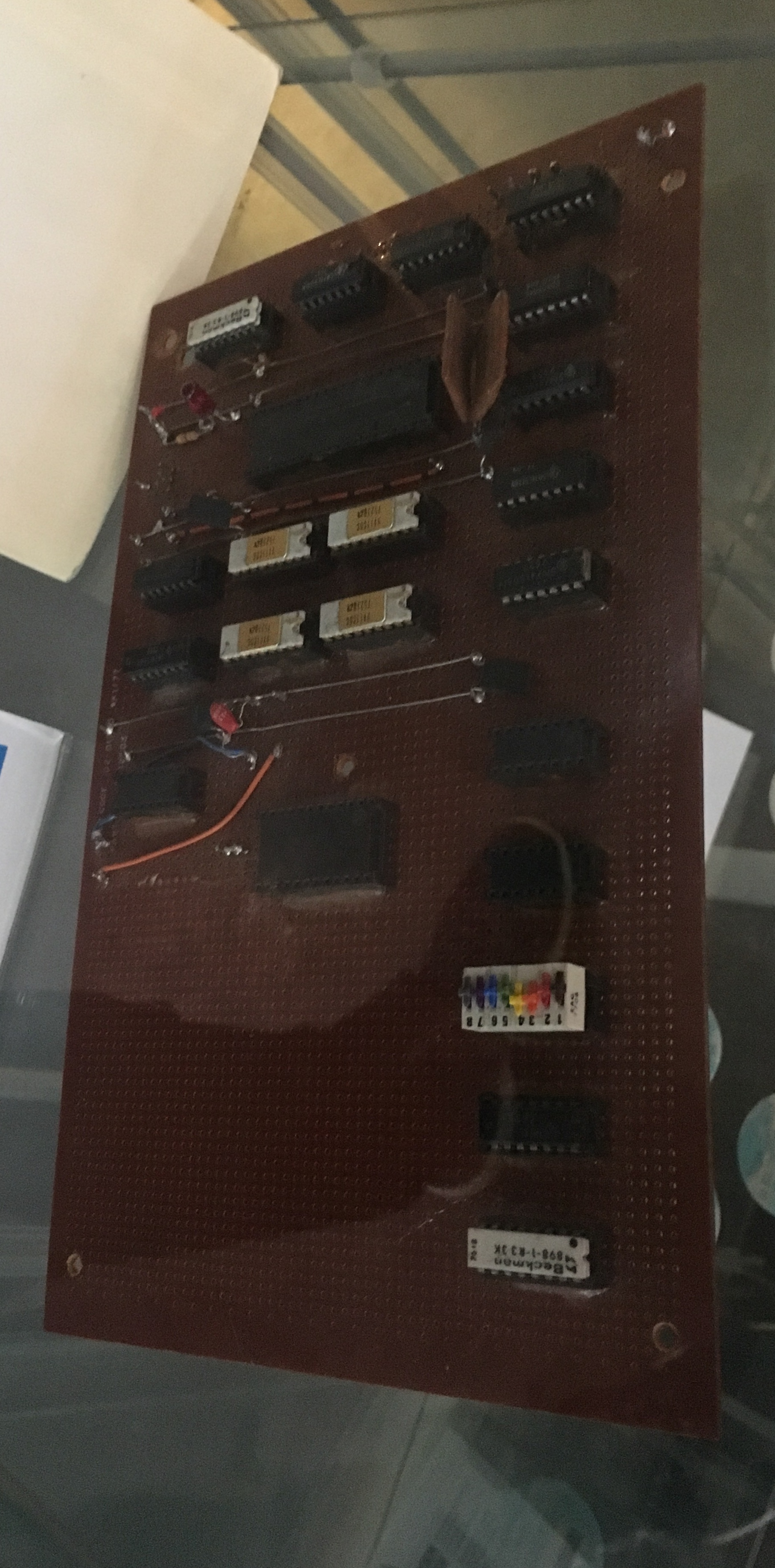
Prototype of the MK14

=== Design ===
From 1974, Ian Williamson was working at the engineering firm Cambridge Consultants Ltd (CCL) where he repeatedly tried to interest the firm in producing microprocessor-based arcade games. With no success there, he began to consider designing a small computer kit for the growing number of engineers interested in microprocessors. He decided it would have to cost around £50-£60. In 1976, Bywood Electronics released the SCRUMPI kit at £56, based on the National Semiconductor SC/MP. But the SCRUMPI lacked a keyboard or display, it instead included circuitry to connect it to a computer terminal, which were very expensive.

Williamson decided to design his own version to address these issues. National had an evaluation system known as the IntroKit that included the SC/MP processor, 256 bytes of RAM, and several support chips. Among these was a system that interfaced the board to the KBDKit, a handheld electronic calculator that was used as a basic display and keyboard. But instead of using National's version, Williamson used a calculator chip already being used at CCL, and went looking for a very low-cost calculator to replace National's. This led to the use of a bright red Sinclair Cambridge Memory calculator from Sinclair Radionics as the interface.

By this time, in the spring of 1977, Williamson was offered a job at British Leyland, which he accepted. He approached the managers at CCL to take on production of his computer design, but they were uninterested. This led naturally to Sinclair, who already made the calculator he was using and had a long history in selling kits.

=== Sinclair ===
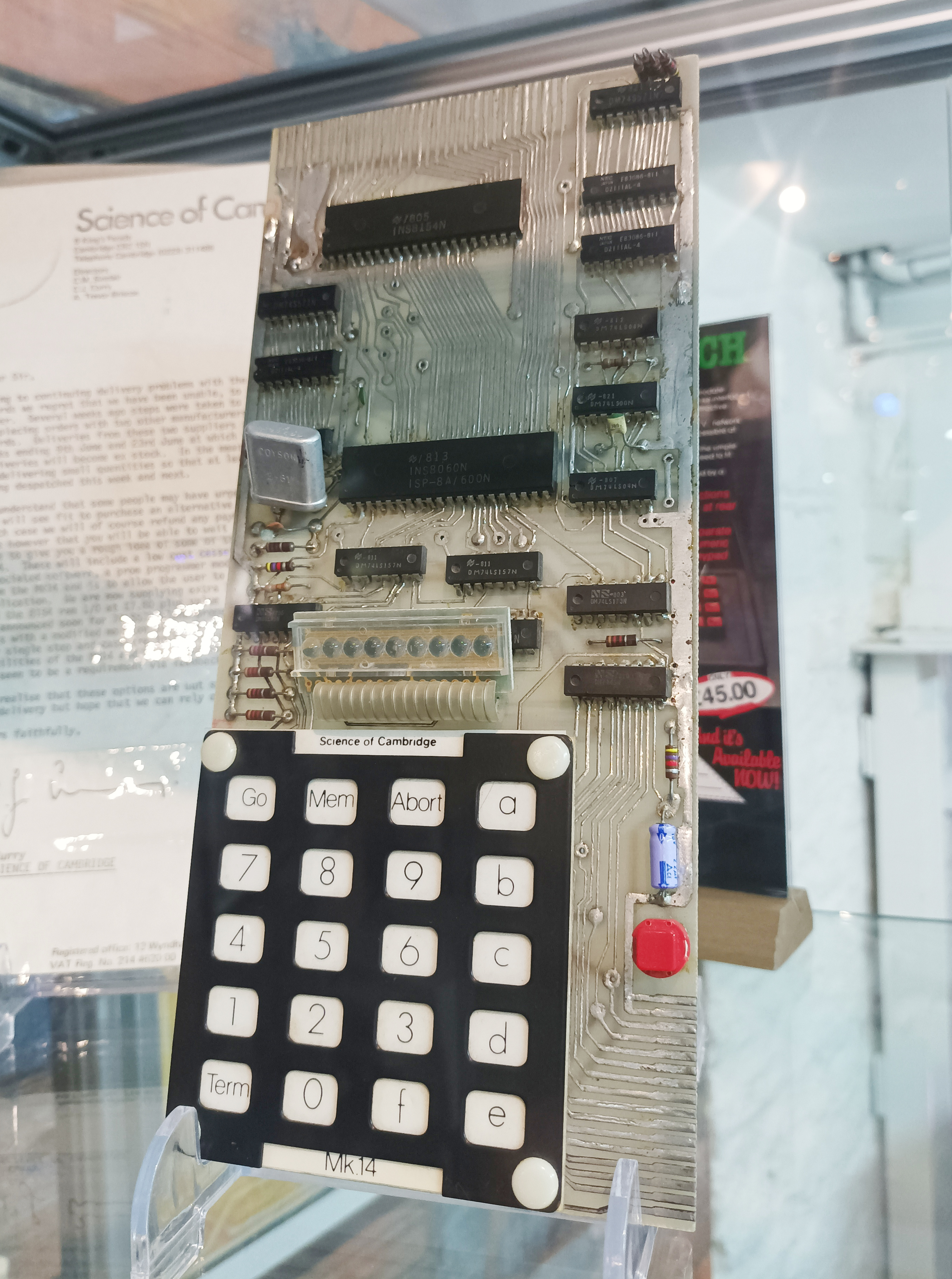
Sinclair MK14, with two upgrades from the basic specification: the INS8154N RAM/IO chip, and two 256 × 4 bit RAM chips. The 5V DC regulator and the keycaps are missing.

Sinclair Radionics had been nationalised and Clive Sinclair was losing control of the company. In 1976, he set up Science of Cambridge (originally as Sinclair Instruments) to recreate Radionics' early mail-order kit success. He handed the company to Chris Curry, who ran the company single-handedly. Their first product was the kit-form Sinclair Wrist Calculator which was moderately successful but relatively low quality. When Williamson approached Sinclair and Curry, they both liked the idea and saw the potential of selling this more advanced kit into the hobby market.

When Curry approached National inquiring about costs for a mass purchase of the SC/MP, National countered by offering them a completely developed computer system based entirely on National's parts. The design combined National's SC/MP Introkit and Keyboard Kit and they offered the resulting design for free, along with some basic software, in exchange for a contract for the parts. Sinclair decided this was a far better deal than what he could arrange using Williamson's design, and Williamson was cut out of further development. Williamson would later be paid £2,000, ostensibly for writing a manual.

It was put on the market at £39.95 plus £3.20 VAT and 40 pence postage and handling. They placed an initial order with National for 2,000 sets, but the low cost resulted in early orders for 20,000. The first systems began to arrive in February 1978, but real production quantities did not begin to arrive for another three months. Contemporary coverage reported that Science of Cambridge had supply problems meeting demand for MK14 kits, resulting in a large backlog of orders. Published accounts have given different figures for the total number sold. According to Curry, the name stood for "microprocessor kit" with fourteen components, although many people took it to mean "Mark 14".

== Specification ==
The computer is based around National Semiconductor's SC/MP CPU (INS8060) and shipped with 256 bytes of random-access memory (RAM) and 512 bytes of read-only memory (ROM) as standard. It used an eight or nine digit red light-emitting diode (LED) seven segment display although only eight digits were usable, there was also optional VDU supporting 32×16 text or 64×64 graphics. Input was by a 20-key keyboard and reset switch.

Cassette-based storage was supported by software included in the MK14 monitor, with a separate Science of Cambridge cassette interface board used to store programs and data on a tape recorder.

The on-board RAM could be increased from 256 bytes in two ways: by adding two further 256 × 4-bit 2111 RAM chips, giving an additional 256 bytes, and by adding the optional INS8154 RAM/I/O chip, which provided 128 bytes of RAM as well as I/O lines. This gave a maximum of 640 bytes of RAM on board. A contemporary Practical Electronics review mentioned making a further 1.5K of RAM available at X200–X7FF, giving a total of 2,176 bytes of RAM. Williamson and Dale give the corresponding MK14 memory-map basis, showing six 256-byte unused blocks available for expansion, and their Appendix C gives the 1½K memory-expansion circuit.

=== Hardware ===
The MK14 was supplied as a self-assembly kit with the following major components

Component	Part	Function
CPU	INS8060N (ISP-8A/600)	SC/MP-II 8-bit microprocessor
Clock	4.433619 MHz or 4.000 MHz	System clock
PROM	DM74S571 (512 × 4) ×2	512 byte monitor PROM (SCIOS)
RAM	MM2111-1N (256 × 4) ×2 (plus ×2 optional)	Onboard static RAM, 256 bytes or 512 bytes
I/O	INS8154 (optional)	128 × 8 RAM and parallel I/O
Display	NSA1198/1188	Eight- or nine-digit magnified 7-segment LED display
Keyboard	20-key keypad	Hexadecimal input

Other supporting logic included multiplexers, latches, buffers and a regulator.

== See also ==
- Microprocessor development board
