= RGBA color model =

RGB color model with an opacity channel

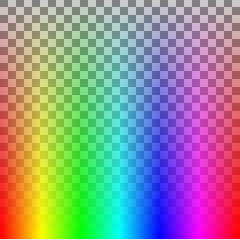
Example of an RGBA image composited over a checkerboard background. alpha is 0% at the top and 100% at the bottom.

RGBA stands for red green blue alpha. While it is sometimes described as a color space, it is actually a three-channel RGB color model supplemented with a fourth alpha channel. Alpha indicates how opaque each pixel is and allows an image to be combined over others using alpha compositing, with transparent areas and anti-aliasing of the edges of opaque regions. Each pixel is a 4D vector.

The term does not define what RGB color space is being used. It also does not state whether or not the colors are premultiplied by the alpha value, and if they are it does not state what color space that premultiplication was done in. This means more information than just "RGBA" is needed to determine how to handle an image.

In some contexts the abbreviation "RGBA" means a specific memory layout (called RGBA8888 below), with other terms such as "BGRA" used for alternatives. In other contexts "RGBA" means any layout.

== Representation ==
In computer graphics, pixels encoding the RGBA color space information must be stored in computer memory (or in files on disk). In most cases four equal-sized pieces of adjacent memory are used, one for each channel, and a 0 in a channel indicates black color or transparent alpha, while all-1 bits indicates white or fully opaque alpha. By far the most common format is to store 8 bits (one byte) for each channel, which is 32 bits for each pixel.

The order of these four bytes in memory can differ, which can lead to confusion when image data is exchanged. These encodings are often denoted by the four letters in some order (most commonly RGBA). The interpretation of these 4-letter mnemonics is not well established. There are two typical ways to understand the mnemonic "RGBA":

- In the byte-order scheme, "RGBA" is understood to mean a byte R, followed by a byte G, followed by a byte B, and followed by a byte A. This scheme is commonly used for describing file formats or network protocols, which are both byte-oriented.
- In the word-order scheme, "RGBA" is understood to represent a complete 32-bit word, where R is more significant than G, which is more significant than B, which is more significant than A.

In a big-endian system, the two schemes are equivalent. This is not the case for a little-endian system, where the two mnemonics are reverses of each other. Therefore, to be unambiguous, it is important to state which ordering is used when referring to the encoding. This article will use a scheme that has some popularity, which is to add the suffix "8888" to indicate if 4 8-bit units or "32" if one 32-bit unit are being discussed.

RGBA representation converter
	Little-endian	Big-endian
RGBA8888	ABGR32	RGBA32
ARGB32	BGRA8888	ARGB8888
RGBA32	ABGR8888	RGBA8888

=== RGBA8888 ===
In OpenGL and Portable Network Graphics (PNG), the RGBA byte order is used, where the colors are stored in memory such that R is at the lowest address, G after it, B after that, and A last. On a little endian architecture this is equivalent to ABGR32.

In many systems when there are more than 8 bits per channel (such as 16 bits or floating-point), the channels are stored in RGBA order, even if 8-bit channels are stored in some other order.

=== ARGB32 ===
The channels are arranged in memory in such manner that a single 32-bit unsigned integer has the alpha sample in the highest 8 bits, followed by the red sample, green sample and finally the blue sample in the lowest 8 bits:

Sample layout in a typical 32bpp pixel

ARGB values are typically expressed using 8 hexadecimal digits, with each pair of the hexadecimal digits representing the values of the Alpha, Red, Green and Blue channel, respectively. For example, 80FFFF00 represents 50.2% opaque (non-premultiplied) yellow. The 80 hex value, which is 128 in decimal, represents a 50.2% alpha value because 128 is approximately 50.2% of the maximum value of 255 (FF hex); to continue to decipher the 80FFFF00 value, the first FF represents the maximum value red can have; the second FF is like the previous but for green; the final 00 represents the minimum value blue can have (effectively – no blue). Consequently, red + green yields yellow. In cases where the alpha is not used this can be shortened to 6 digits RRGGBB, this is why it was chosen to put the alpha in the top bits. Depending on the context a 0x or a number sign (#) is put before the hex digits.

This layout became popular when 24-bit color (and 32-bit RGBA) was introduced on personal computers. At the time it was much faster and easier for programs to manipulate one 32-bit unit than four 8-bit units.

On little-endian systems, this is equivalent to BGRA byte order. On big-endian systems, this is equivalent to ARGB byte order.

=== RGBA32 ===
In some software originating on big-endian machines such as Silicon Graphics, colors were stored in 32 bits similar to ARGB32, but with the alpha in the bottom 8 bits rather than the top. For example, 808000FF would be Red and Green:50.2%, Blue:0% and Alpha:100%, a brown. This is what you would get if RGBA8888 data was read as words on these machines. It is used in Portable Arbitrary Map and in FLTK, but in general it is rare.

The bytes are stored in memory on a little-endian machine in the order ABGR.

== See also ==
- Portable Network Graphics
