= AoS and SoA =

Parallel computing data layout methods

In computing, an array of structures (AoS), structure of arrays (SoA) or array of structures of arrays (AoSoA) are contrasting ways to arrange a sequence of records in memory, with regard to interleaving. This is of interest with respect to software performance, especially when utilizing data-parallel operations, such as SIMD or SIMT.

== Structure of arrays ==
Structure of arrays (SoA) is a layout separating elements of a record (or 'struct' in the C programming language) into one parallel array per field. The motivation is easier manipulation with packed SIMD instructions in most instruction set architectures, since a single SIMD register can load homogeneous data, possibly transferred by a wide internal datapath (e.g. 128-bit). If only a specific part of the record is needed, only those parts need to be iterated over, allowing more data to fit onto a single cache line. The downside is requiring more cache ways when traversing data, and inefficient indexed addressing.

For example, to store N points in 3D space using a structure of arrays:

struct Vector3List {
    float x[N];
    float y[N];
    float z[N];
};
struct Vector3List points;

float get_point_x(size_t i) {
    return points.x[i];
}

== Array of structures ==
Array of structures (AoS) is the opposite (and more conventional) layout, in which data for different fields is interleaved. This is often more intuitive, and supported directly by most programming languages.

For example, to store N points in 3D space using an array of structures:

struct Vector3 {
    float x;
    float y;
    float z;
};
struct Vector3 points[N];

float get_point_x(size_t i) {
    return points[i].x;
}

== Array of structures of arrays ==
Array of structures of arrays (AoSoA) or tiled array of structs is a hybrid approach between the previous layouts, in which data for different fields is interleaved using tiles or blocks with size equal to the SIMD vector size. This is often less intuitive, but can achieve the memory throughput of the SoA approach, while being more friendly to the cache locality and load port architectures of modern processors. In particular, memory requests in modern processors have to be fulfilled in fixed width (e.g., size of a cacheline). The tiled storage of AoSoA aligns the memory access pattern to the requests' fixed width, leading to fewer access operations to complete a memory request and thus increasing the efficiency.

For example, to store N points in 3D space using an array of structures of arrays with a SIMD register width of 8 floats (or 8×32 = 256 bits):

struct Vector3x8 {
    float x[8];
    float y[8];
    float z[8];
};
struct Vector3x8 points[(N + 7) / 8];
float get_point_x(size_t i) {
    return points[i / 8].x[i % 8];
}

A different width may be needed depending on the actual SIMD register width. The interior arrays may be replaced with SIMD types such as float32x8 for languages with such support.

== Alternatives ==
Between the pure AoS and SoA extremes lie several hybrid layouts. AoSoA (array of structures of arrays), also called tiled or strided/"striped" SoA, interleaves records in blocks whose size is a multiple of the SIMD lane width: this keeps contiguous vector loads for each field while preserving locality when several fields of the same record are accessed together. Intel's optimization guidance recommended such a hybrid layout as early as the 1999 IA-32 optimization manual, and it collapses to AoS when the block size is one and to SoA when the outer array size is one.

== 4D vectors ==
AoS vs. SoA presents a choice when considering 3D or 4D vector data on machines with four-lane SIMD hardware. SIMD ISAs are usually designed for homogeneous data, however some provide a dot product instruction and additional permutes, making the AoS case easier to handle.

Although most GPU hardware has moved away from 4D instructions to scalar SIMT pipelines, modern compute kernels using SoA instead of AoS can still give better performance due to memory coalescing.

== Software support ==
Most languages support the AoS format more naturally by combining records and various array abstract data types.

SoA is mostly found in languages, libraries, or metaprogramming tools used to support a data-oriented design. Examples include:

- "Data frames", as implemented in R, Python's Pandas package, and Julia's DataFrames.jl package, are interfaces to access SoA like AoS.
- The Julia package StructArrays.jl allows for accessing SoA as AoS to combine the performance of SoA with the intuitiveness of AoS.
- Code generators for the C language, including Datadraw and the X Macro technique.

Automated creation of AoSoA is more complex. An example of AoSoA in metaprogramming is found in LANL's Cabana library written in C++; it assumes a vector width of 16 lanes by default.
