= List of works in the Museum of Modern Art =

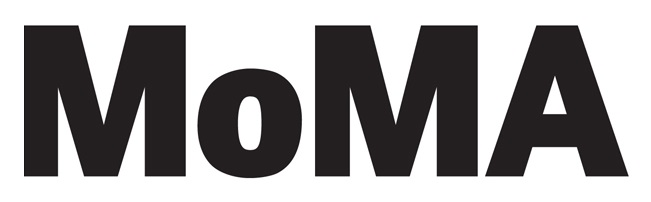
Museum of Modern Art
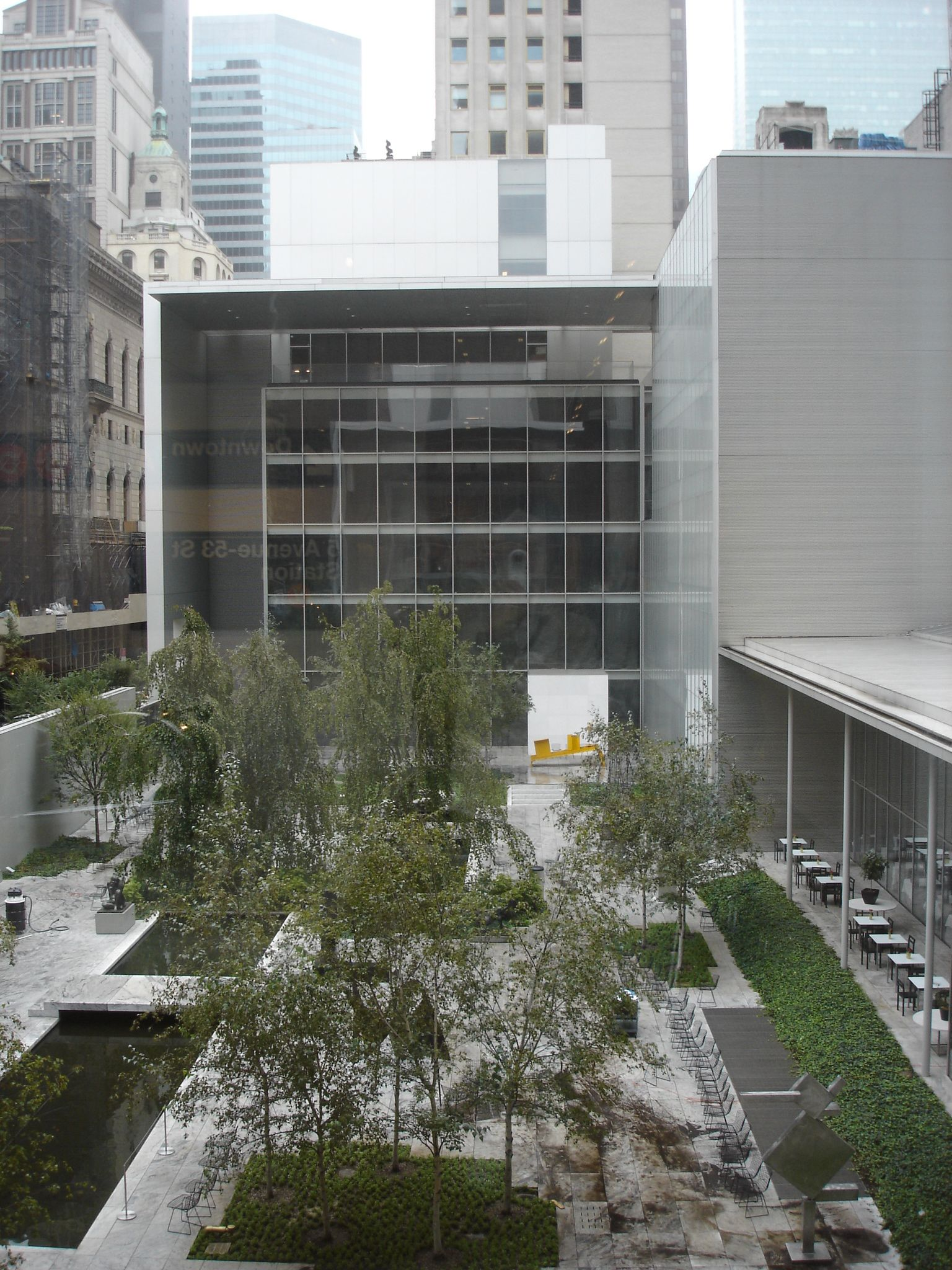

- Location of MoMA in Manhattan
- Established: November 7, 1929; 96 years ago
- Location: 11 West 53rd Street; New York, NY 10019
- Coordinates: 40.761484°N 73.977664°W
- Visitors: 3.1 million (2013); Ranked 13th globally (2013)
- Director: Glenn D. Lowry
- Public transit access: Subway: Fifth Avenue / 53rd Street (E, F, and <F> trains); Bus: M1, M2, M3, M4, M5, M7, M10, M20, M50, M104
- Website: www.moma.org

This is a partial list of works in the Museum of Modern Art, and organized by type and department.

== Department of Painting and Sculpture ==
This is a partial list of works in the Department of Painting and Sculpture, organized by type.

=== Works by decade ===
==== 1880s ====
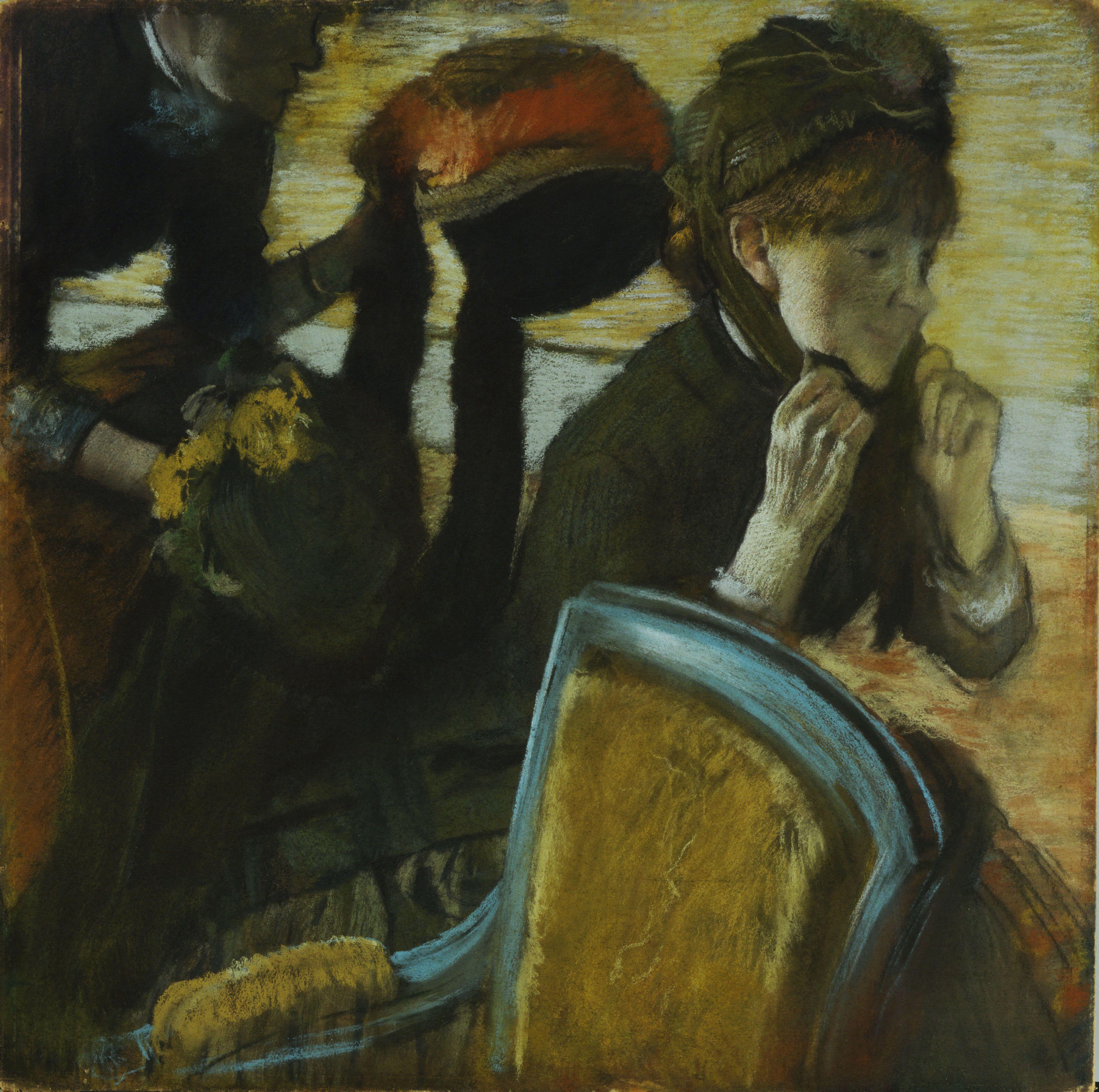
Edgar Degas, At the Milliner's, 1882

- L'Estaque. 1879–83 (Paul Cézanne)
- Still Life with Fruit Dish. 1879–80 (Paul Cézanne)
- At the Milliner's. 1882 (Edgar Degas)
- Two Roses on a Tablecloth. 1882–1883 (Édouard Manet)
- Hand. 1884 Auguste Rodin
- The Bather. c. 1885 (Paul Cézanne)
- Evening, Honfleur. 1886 (Georges-Pierre Seurat)
- Port-en-Bessin, Entrance to the Harbor. 1888 (Georges-Pierre Seurat)
- The Starry Night. Saint Rémy, June 1889 (Vincent van Gogh)
- The Olive Trees. Saint Rémy, June–July 1889 (Vincent van Gogh)

==== 1890s ====
- Opus 217. Against the Enamel of a Background Rhythmic with Beats and Angles, Tones, and Tints, Portrait of M. Félix Fénéon in 1890 (Paul Signac)
- The Seed of the Areoi. 1892 (Paul Gauguin)
- The Storm. 1893 (Edvard Munch)
- Interior, Mother and Sister of the Artist. 1893 (Édouard Vuillard)
- The Sleeping Gypsy. 1897 (Henri Rousseau)
- Monument to Balzac. 1898 (cast 1954) (Auguste Rodin)

==== 1900s ====
- Le Silence. 1900 Odilon Redon
- Château Noir. 1903–04 (Paul Cézanne)
- The Pond—Moonlight. 1904 Edward Steichen
- Boy Leading a Horse 1905–06 (Pablo Picasso)
- The Large Trees. L'Estaque 1906–07 (Georges Braque)
- Bathers. 1907 (André Derain)
- Hope II. 1907–08 (Gustav Klimt)
- Les Demoiselles d'Avignon. Paris, June–July 1907 (Pablo Picasso)
- Street, Dresden. 1908 (reworked 1919; dated on painting 1907) (Ernst Ludwig Kirchner)
- Picture with an Archer. 1909 (Wassily Kandinsky)
- Hans Tietze and Erica Tietze-Conrat. 1909 (Oskar Kokoschka)
- Dance (I). Paris, Boulevard des Invalides, early 1909 (Henri Matisse)

==== 1910s ====
- The Dream. 1910 (Henri Rousseau)
- The Funeral of the Anarchist Galli. 1910 (Carlo Carrà)
- I and the Village. 1911 (Marc Chagall)
- The Red Studio. Issy-les-Moulineaux, fall 1911 (Henri Matisse)
- Unique Forms of Continuity in Space. 1913 (cast 1931) (Umberto Boccioni)
- The City Rises. 1910 Umberto Boccioni
- Simultaneous Contrasts: Sun and Moon. Paris 1913 (dated on painting 1912) (Robert Delaunay)
- Landscape, 1912–14 (Jean Metzinger)
- Portrait of Igor Stravinsky, 1914 (Albert Gleizes)
- Bicycle Wheel. New York, 1951 (third version, after lost original of 1913) (Marcel Duchamp)
- Network of Stoppages. Paris, 1914 (Marcel Duchamp)
- The Nostalgia of the Infinite. 1913–1914 (Giorgio de Chirico)
- The Song of Love. Paris, June–July 1914 (Giorgio de Chirico)
- Gare Montparnasse (The Melancholy of Departure). 1914 (Giorgio de Chirico)
- The Double Dream of Spring. 1915 (Giorgio de Chirico)
- Panel for Edwin R. Campbell No. 2. 1914 (Wassily Kandinsky)
- Woman on a High Stool. Paris, 1914 (Henri Matisse)
- View of Notre-Dame. Paris, 1914 (Henri Matisse)
- Goldfish and Palette. Paris, quai Saint-Michel, fall 1914 (Henri Matisse)
- Birthday. 1915 (Marc Chagall)
- The Moroccans. Issy-les-Moulineaux, late 1915 and fall 1916 (Henri Matisse)
- Anna Zborowska. 1917 (Amedeo Modigliani)
- Painterly Architectonic. 1917 (Lyubov Popova)
- Suprematist Composition: White on White. 1918 (Kazimir Malevich)
- To Be Looked at (from the Other Side of the Glass) with One Eye, Close to, for Almost an Hour. Buenos Aires, 1918 (Marcel Duchamp)

==== 1920s ====
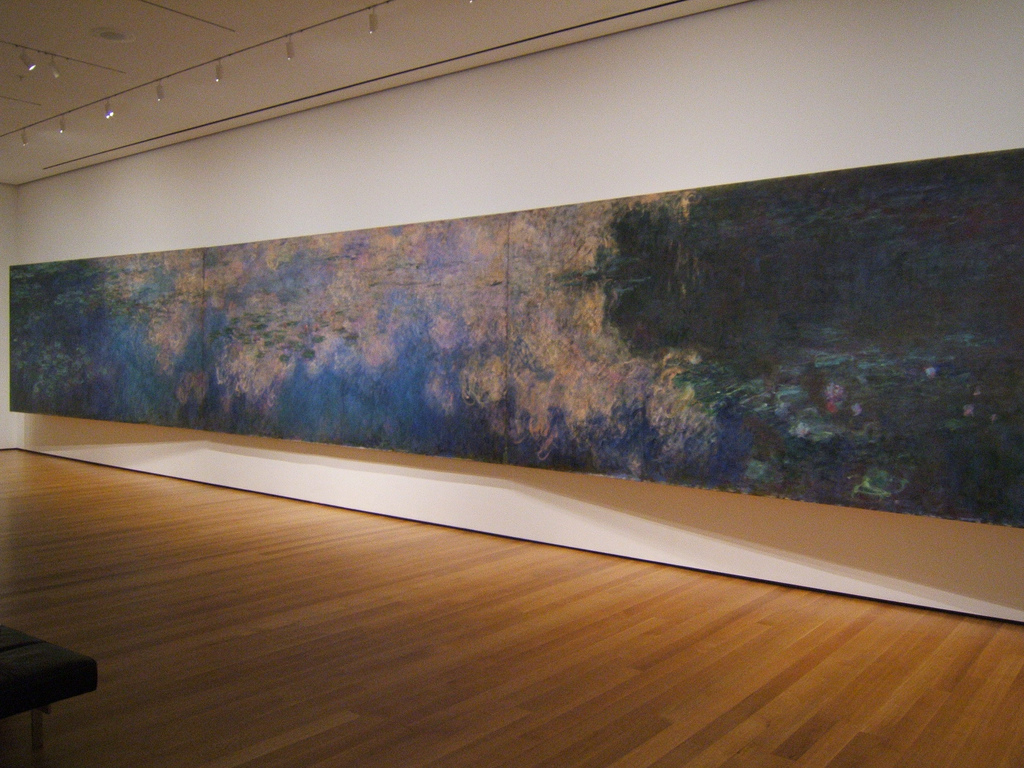
Claude Monet, Reflections of Clouds on the Water-Lily Pond, c. 1920, 200 × 1,276 cm (78.74 × 502.36 in), oil on canvas, at the Museum of Modern Art, New York City

- Water Lilies triptych. 1920 Claude Monet
- Three Women. 1921–22 (Fernand Léger)
- Three Musicians. Fontainebleau, summer 1921 (Pablo Picasso)
- Maquette for Radio-Announcer. 1922 (Gustav Klutsis)
- Twittering Machine. 1922 (Paul Klee)
- Two Children Are Threatened by a Nightingale. 1924 (Max Ernst)
- House by the Railroad. 1925 (Edward Hopper)
- The Birth of the World. Montroig, late summer-fall 1925 (Joan Miró)
- Dr. Mayer-Hermann. Berlin 1926 (Otto Dix)
- The Menaced Assassin. Belgium, 1927 (René Magritte)
- Cat and Bird. 1928 (Paul Klee)
- The False Mirror. France, 1929 (René Magritte)
- Farmhouse Window and Door. October 1929 (Georgia O'Keeffe)
- Fire in the Evening. 1929 (Paul Klee)

==== 1930s ====
- Simultaneous Counter-Composition. 1929–30 (Theo van Doesburg)
- Painting. 1929–1930 (Patrick Henry Bruce)
- Fish. Paris 1930 (Constantin Brâncuși)
- The Persistence of Memory. 1931 (Salvador Dalí)
- Agrarian Leader Zapata. 1931 (Diego Rivera)
- Departure. Frankfurt 1932, Berlin 1933–35 (Max Beckmann)
- The Bathroom. 1932 (Pierre Bonnard)
- The Palace at 4 a.m. 1932 (Alberto Giacometti)
- Girl before a Mirror. Boisgeloup, March 1932 (Pablo Picasso)
- Bather with Beach Ball. Boisgeloup, August 1932 (Pablo Picasso)
- "Hirondelle Amour". Barcelona, late fall 1933-winter 1934 (Joan Miró)
- Object. Paris, 1936 (Meret Oppenheim)
- Still Life with Old Shoe, 1937 (Joan Miró)

==== 1940s ====
- The River. Begun 1938–39; completed 1943 (cast 1948) (Aristide Maillol)
- Taglioni's Jewel Casket. 1940 (Joseph Cornell)
- Gas. 1940 (Edward Hopper)
- Self-Portrait with Cropped Hair. 1940 (Frida Kahlo)
- Broadway Boogie Woogie. 1942–43 (Piet Mondrian)
- Diary of a Seducer. 1945 (Arshile Gorky)
- Painting (1946). 1946 (Francis Bacon)
- Shimmering Substance. 1946 (Jackson Pollock)
- Man Pointing. 1947 (Alberto Giacometti)
- Summation. 1947 (Arshile Gorky)
- Christina's World. 1948 Andrew Wyeth
- City Square. 1948 (Alberto Giacometti)
- The Plum Blossoms. 1948 (Henri Matisse)
- The Kitchen. Paris, November 1948 (Pablo Picasso)
- No. 1A. 1948 (Jackson Pollock)
- No. 3/No. 13. 1949 (Mark Rothko)

==== 1950s ====
- Woman, I. 1950–52 (Willem de Kooning)
- Chief. 1950 (Franz Kline)
- No. 10. 1950 (Mark Rothko)
- Vir Heroicus Sublimis. 1950–51 (Barnett Newman)
- One: Number 31, 1950. 1950 (Jackson Pollock)
- Australia. 1951 (David Smith)
- Visa. 1951 (Stuart Davis)
- Colors for a Large Wall. 1951 (Ellsworth Kelly)
- The Town of the Poor. 1951 (Sonja Sekula)
- Untitled. 1952 (Carmen Herrera)
- And Then We Saw the Daughter of the Minotaur. 1953 (Leonora Carrington)
- Georgie Arce. 1953 (Alice Neel)
- New York, VIII. 1954 (Hedda Sterne)
- Flag. 1954–55 (dated on reverse 1954) (Jasper Johns)
- Bed. 1955 (Robert Rauschenberg)
- Orange. 1955 (Lygia Pape)
- Untitled. 1956 (Lygia Pape)
- Towards Disappearance, II. Paris 1957–58 (Sam Francis)
- Jacob's Ladder. 1957 (Helen Frankenthaler)
- Shinnecock Canal. 1957 (Grace Hartigan)
- Ladybug. 1957 (Joan Mitchell)
- Sky Cathedral. 1958 (Louise Nevelson)
- Watching the Clock. 1958 (Kay Sage)
- Black Widow. Waterbury, Connecticut, 1959 (Alexander Calder)
- The Marriage of Reason and Squalor, II. 1959 (Frank Stella)
- Cocoon no.2. 1959 (Lygia Clark)

==== 1960s ====
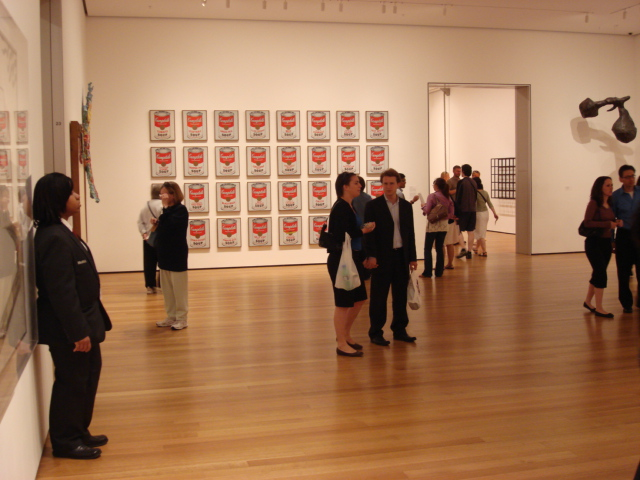
Andy Warhol Campbell's Soup Cans, 1962. Installation at MoMA, c. 2007

- A Tree in Naples. 1960 (Willem de Kooning)
- Untitled. 1960 (Eva Hesse)
- The White Line. 1960 (Sam Francis)
- Abstract Painting. 1960–61 (Ad Reinhardt)
- Turnsole. 1961 (Kenneth Noland)
- Beta Lambda. 1961 (Morris Louis)
- Untitled. 1961 (Lee Bontecou)
- Pin-up. 1961 (Richard Hamilton)
- Girl with Ball. 1961 (Roy Lichtenstein)
- Grandes Carrières. 1961–1962 (Joan Mitchell)
- Memoria in Aeternum. 1962 (Hans Hofmann)
- Brooklyn Bridge VII. 1962 (Ellsworth Kelly)
- Achrome. 1962 (Piero Manzoni)
- Campbell's Soup Cans. 1962 Andy Warhol
- Gold Marilyn Monroe. 1962 (Andy Warhol)
- OOF. 1962 (reworked 1963) (Edward Ruscha)
- Untitled (tool). 1963 (Lee Lozano)
- Friendship. 1963 (Agnes Martin)
- The Tree. 1964 (Agnes Martin)
- Untitled. 1964 (Mira Schendel)
- Return 1. 1964–1965 (Brice Marden)
- Box Bolide 12, 'archeologic'. 1964–65 (Hélio Oiticica)
- F-111. 1964–65 (James Rosenquist)
- White Cabinet and White Table. 1965 (Marcel Broodthaers)
- Eurasia Siberian Symphony 1963. 1966 (Joseph Beuys)
- Mauve District. 1966 (Helen Frankenthaler)
- Serial Project, I (ABCD). 1966 (Sol LeWitt)
- Letters the 26 Series. 1966 (Richard Tuttle)
- Moonbird. 1966 (Joan Miró)
- Giant Soft Fan. 1966–67 (Claes Oldenburg)
- PR. 1967 (Dan Christensen)
- 7. 1967 (Peter Young)
- Untitled (Stack). 1967 (Donald Judd)
- The American People Series #20: Die. 1967 (Faith Ringgold)
- Torsion. 1968 (Giovanni Anselmo)
- Repetition Nineteen III. 1968 (Eva Hesse)
- Rancho. 1968 (Edward Ruscha)
- Ring. 1968 (Ronald Davis)
- Diamond Lake. 1969 (Ronnie Landfield)
- Broken Obelisk. 1963–1969 (Barnett Newman)
- 144 Lead Square. 1969 (Carl Andre)
- Untitled. 1969 (Richard Hamilton)
- Corner Mirror with Coral. 1969 (Robert Smithson)

==== 1970s ====
- Patchwork Quilt. 1970 (Romare Bearden)
- Untitled. 1970 (Blinky Palermo)
- Wooden Room. 1972 (Anselm Kiefer)
- Grove Group I. 1972–73 (Brice Marden)
- Bound Square. 1972 (Jackie Winsor)
- Fiery Sunset. 1973 (Alma Woodsey Thomas)
- Leonardo's Lady. 1974 (Audrey Flack)
- Bingo. 1974 (Gordon Matta-Clark)
- Axes. 1976 (Susan Rothenberg)
- Box and Shadow. 1978 (Philip Guston)
- Sweet Cathy's Song (For Cathy Elzea). 1978 (Joan Snyder)

==== 1980s ====
- Wood, Wind, No Tuba. 1980 (Joan Mitchell)
- Pair of Rock Chairs. 1980–81 (Scott Burton)
- New Shelton Wet/Dry Doubledecker. 1981 (Jeff Koons)
- Human/Need/Desire. 1983 (Bruce Nauman)
- Nile Born. 1984 (Ana Mendieta)
- Watchtower. 1984 (Sigmar Polke)
- Greed's Trophy. 1984 (Martin Puryear)
- Pace. 1984 (Robert Ryman)
- Untitled. 1987 (Rosemarie Trockel)
- Transparent Self-Portrait. 1987 (Maria Lassnig)
- Meaning of the Interval. 1987 (Edin Velez)
- Untitled. 1987–90 (Kiki Smith)
- The Passageway. 1988 (Wolfgang Laib)
- Learned Helplessness in Rats (Rock and Roll Drummer). 1988 (Bruce Nauman)
- October 18, 1977. 1988 (Gerhard Richter)
- Map of the World. 1989 (Alighiero e Boetti)
- Laments (I Want to Live...). 1989 (Jenny Holzer)
- Dis Pair. 1989–90 (Elizabeth Murray)

==== 1990s ====
- Adjustable Wall Bra. 1990–91 (Vito Acconci)
- Medusa's Head. 1990 (Chris Burden)
- High Falutin'. 1990 (David Hammons)
- Untitled. 1991 (Robert Gober)
- "Untitled" (Perfect Lovers). 1991 (Felix Gonzalez-Torres)
- Family Romance. 1993 (Charles Ray)
- Silence. 1994 (Mona Hatoum)
- Black Newborn. 1994 (Sherrie Levine)
- A Frontal Passage. 1994 (James Turrell)
- Untitled. 1995 (Doris Salcedo)
- Succulent Eggplants. 1996 (Beatriz Milhazes)
- Self-Portrait. 1997 (Chuck Close)
- Untitled (Paperbacks). 1997 (Rachel Whiteread)
- Borrowing Your Enemy's Arrows. 1998 (Cai Guo-Qiang)
- Torqued Ellipse IV. 1998 (Richard Serra)
- Prince amongst Thieves. 1999 (Chris Ofili)
- The Cabinet of Baby Fay La Foe. 2000 (Matthew Barney)
- Lumumba. 2000 (Luc Tuymans)

==== 2000s ====
- Break the Silence (Gabisile Nkosi)

=== Gallery ===
==== 1880s gallery ====
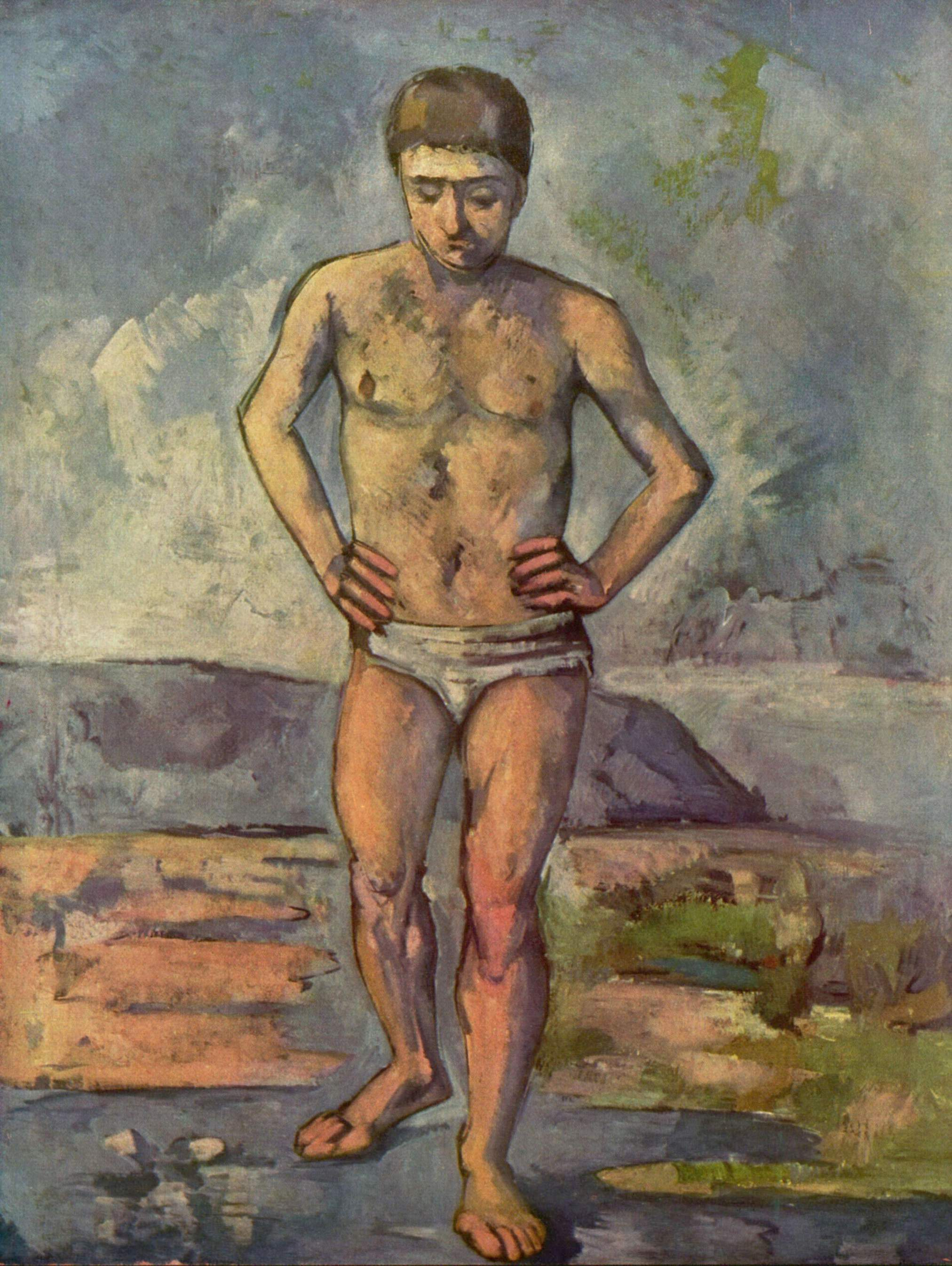
Paul Cézanne, Bather, 1885–1887

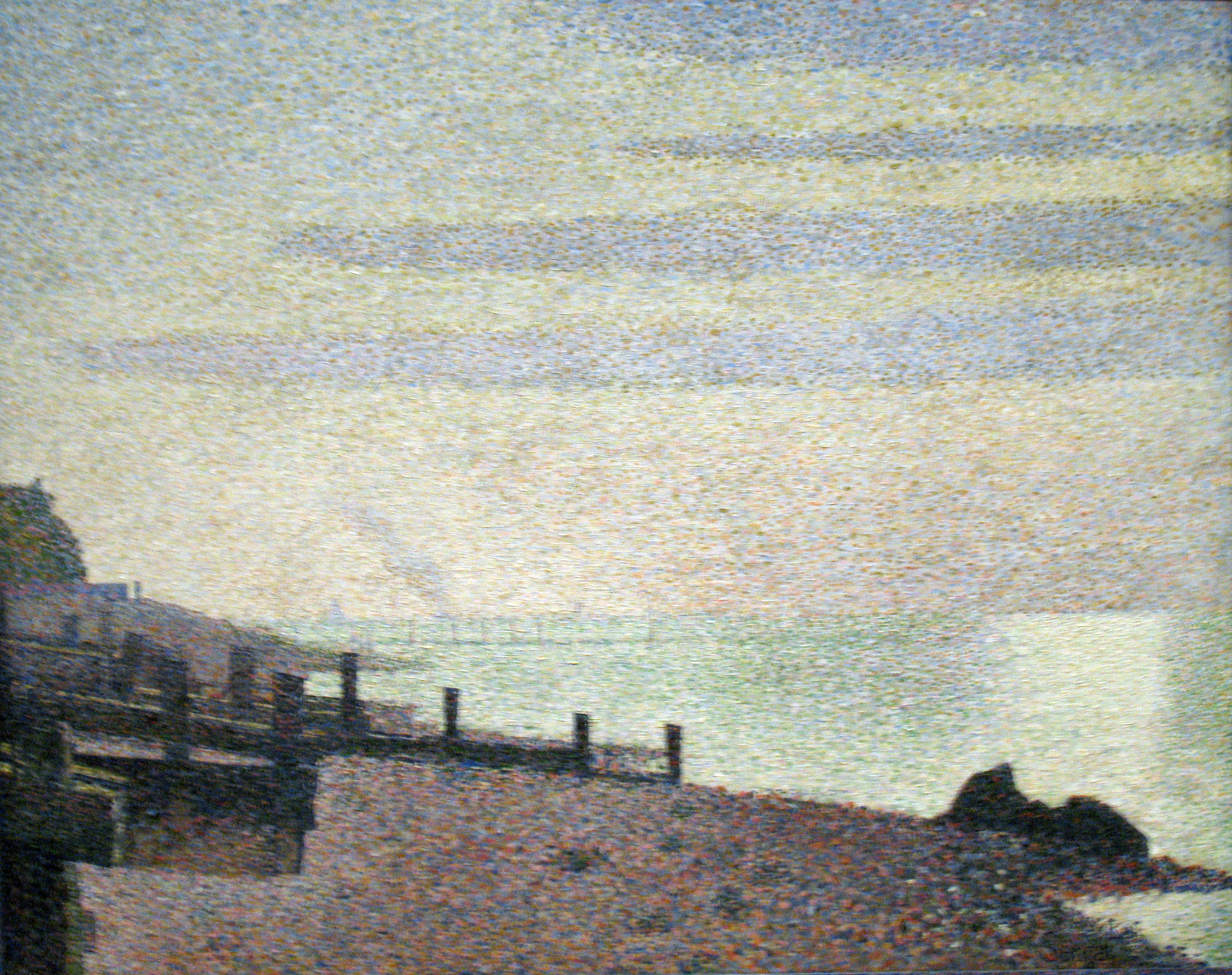
Georges-Pierre Seurat Evening, Honfleurs, 1886

Vincent van Gogh, The Starry Night, 1889

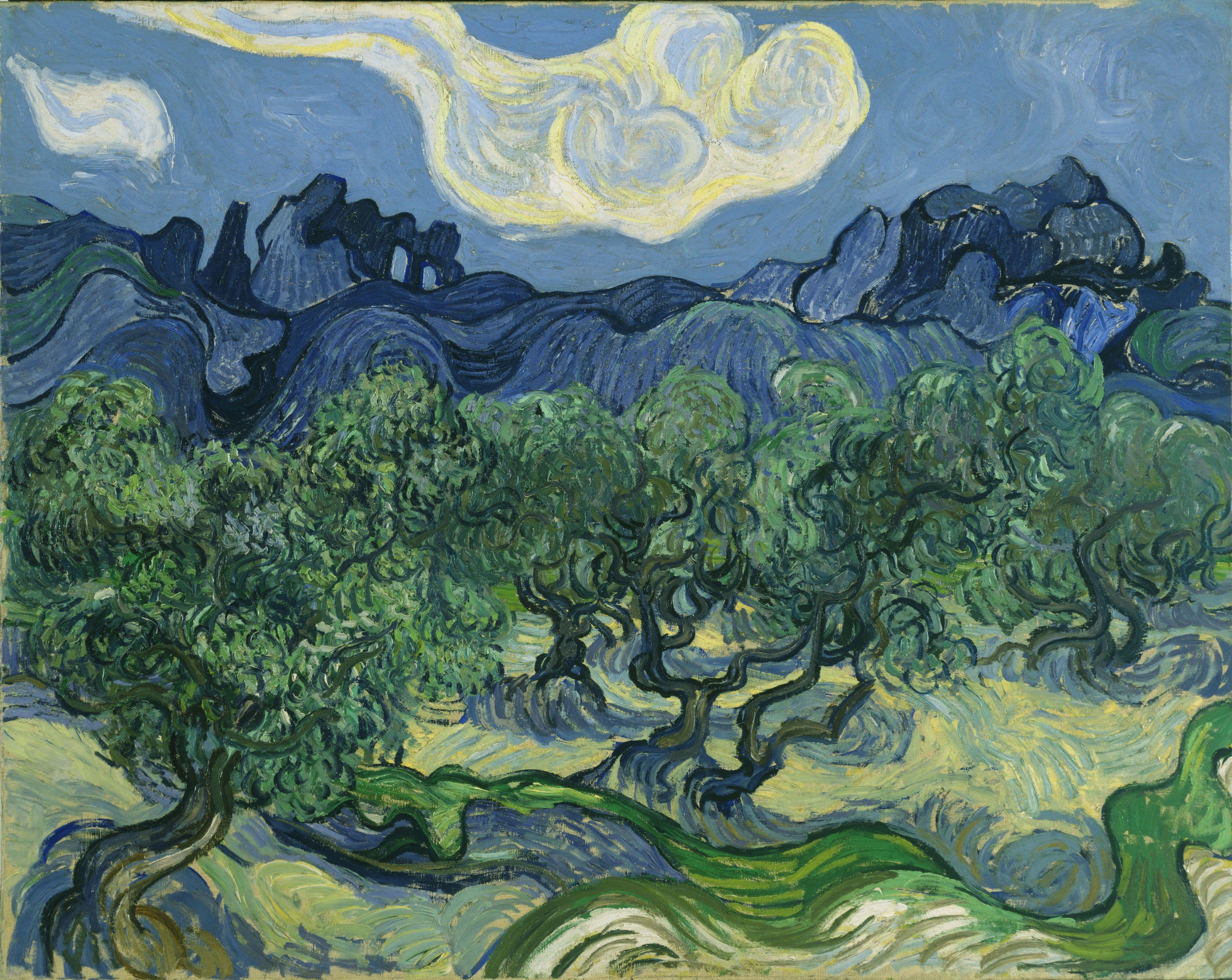
Vincent van Gogh, The Olive Trees with the Alpilles in the Background, 1889

==== 1890s gallery ====
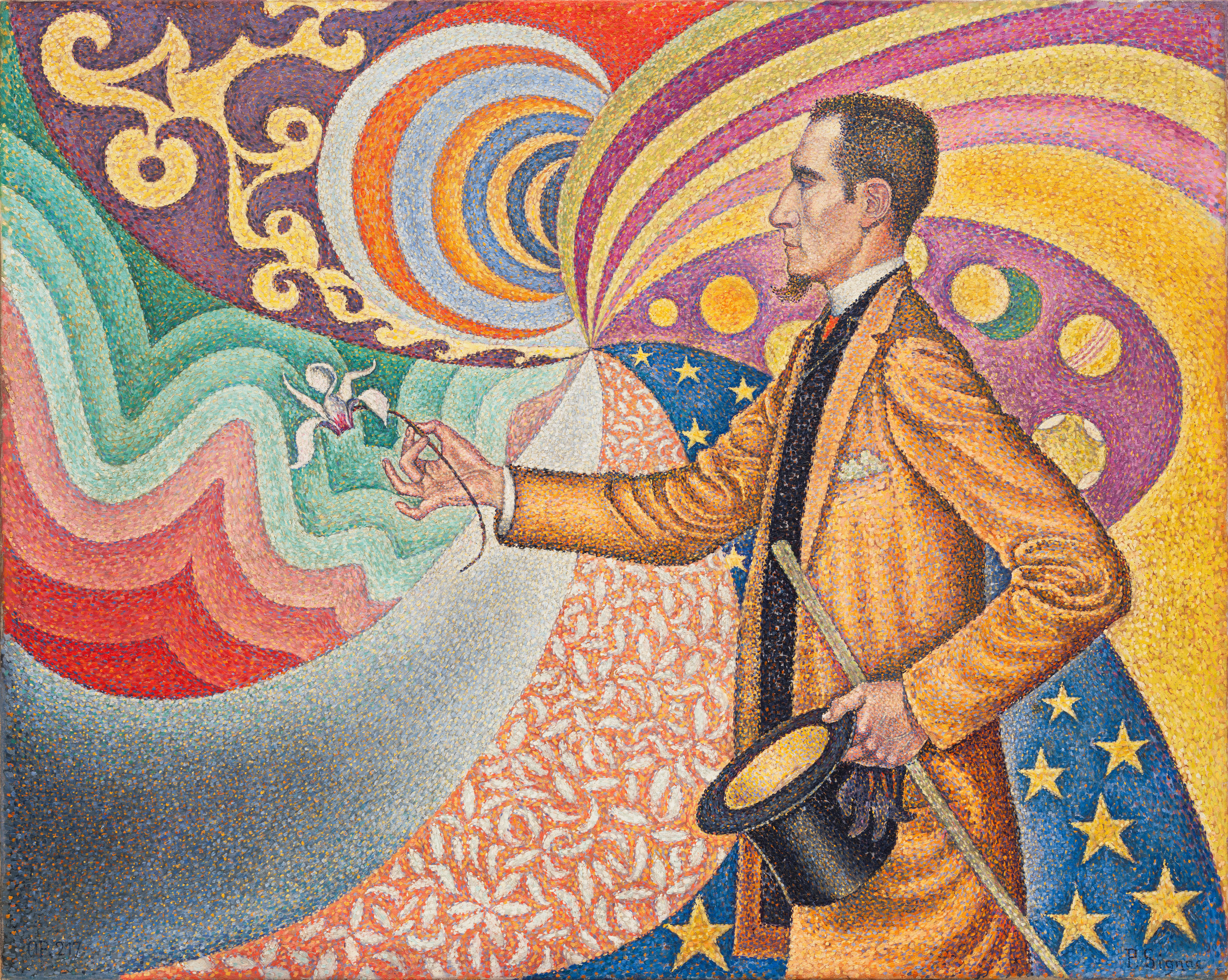
Paul Signac, Félix Fénéon, 1890

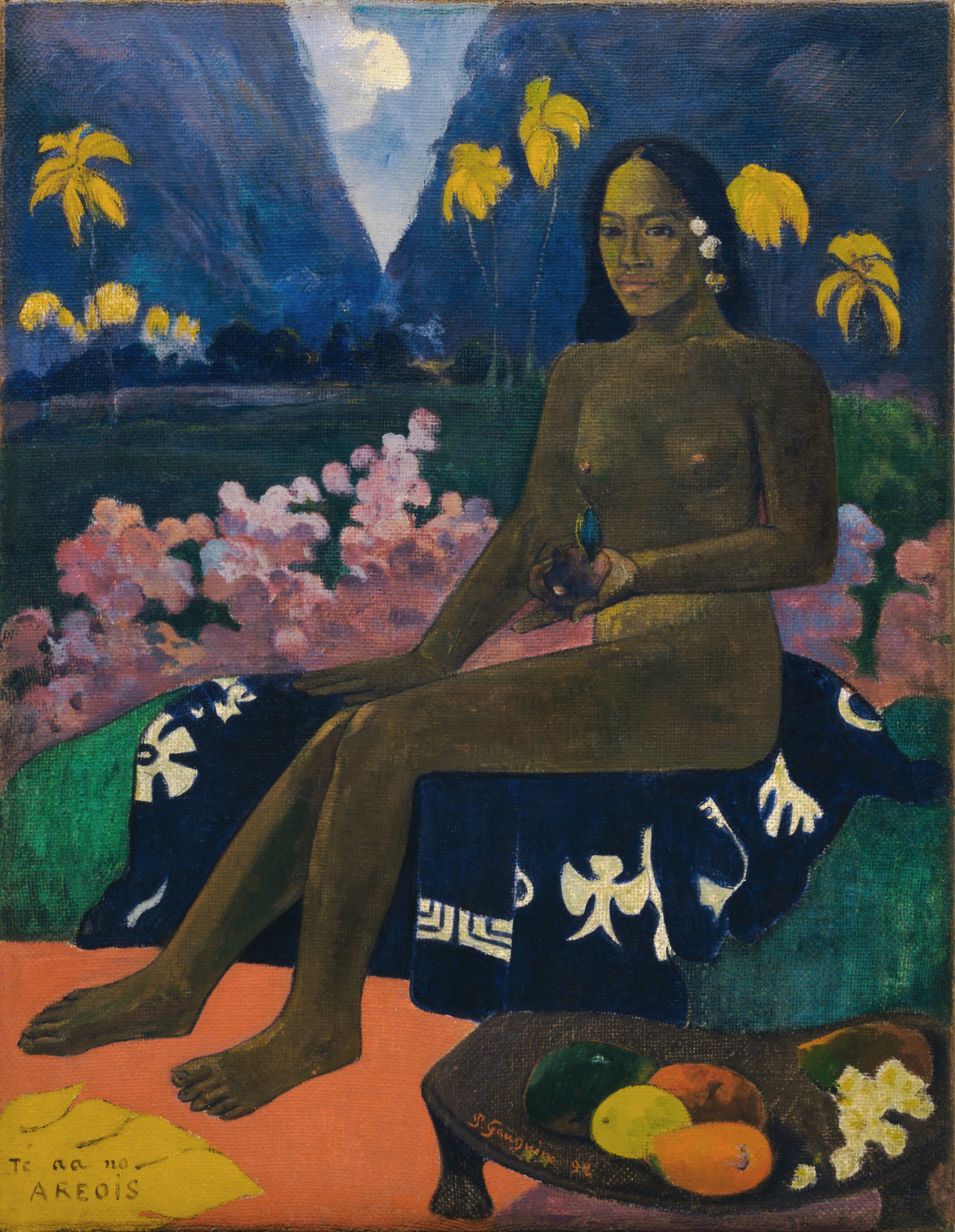
Paul Gauguin, Te aa no areois (The Seed of the Areoi), 1892

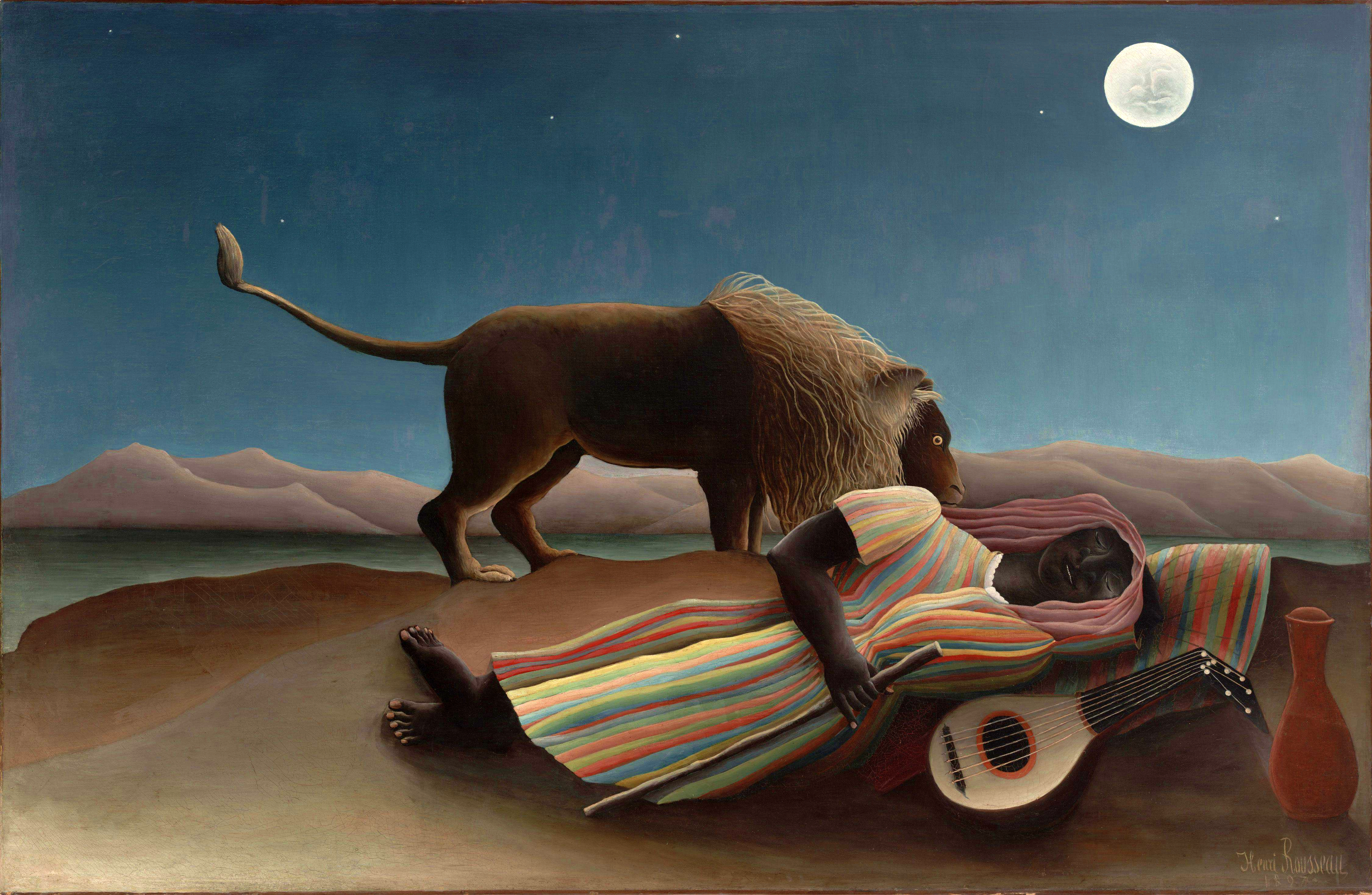
Henri Rousseau, La Bohémienne endormie (The Sleeping Gypsy – Zingara che dorme), 1897

==== 1900s gallery ====
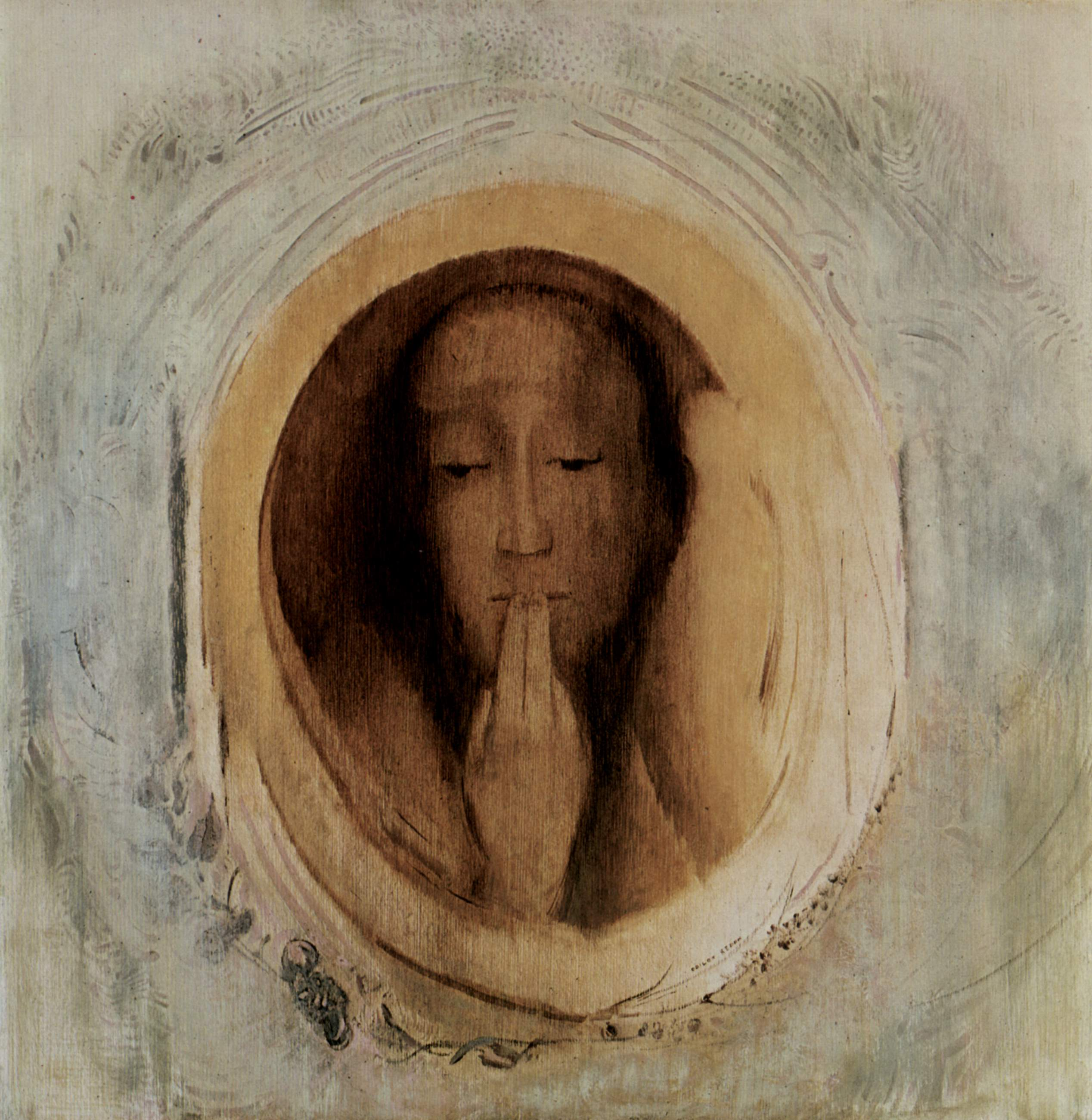
Odilon Redon, Le Silence, 1900

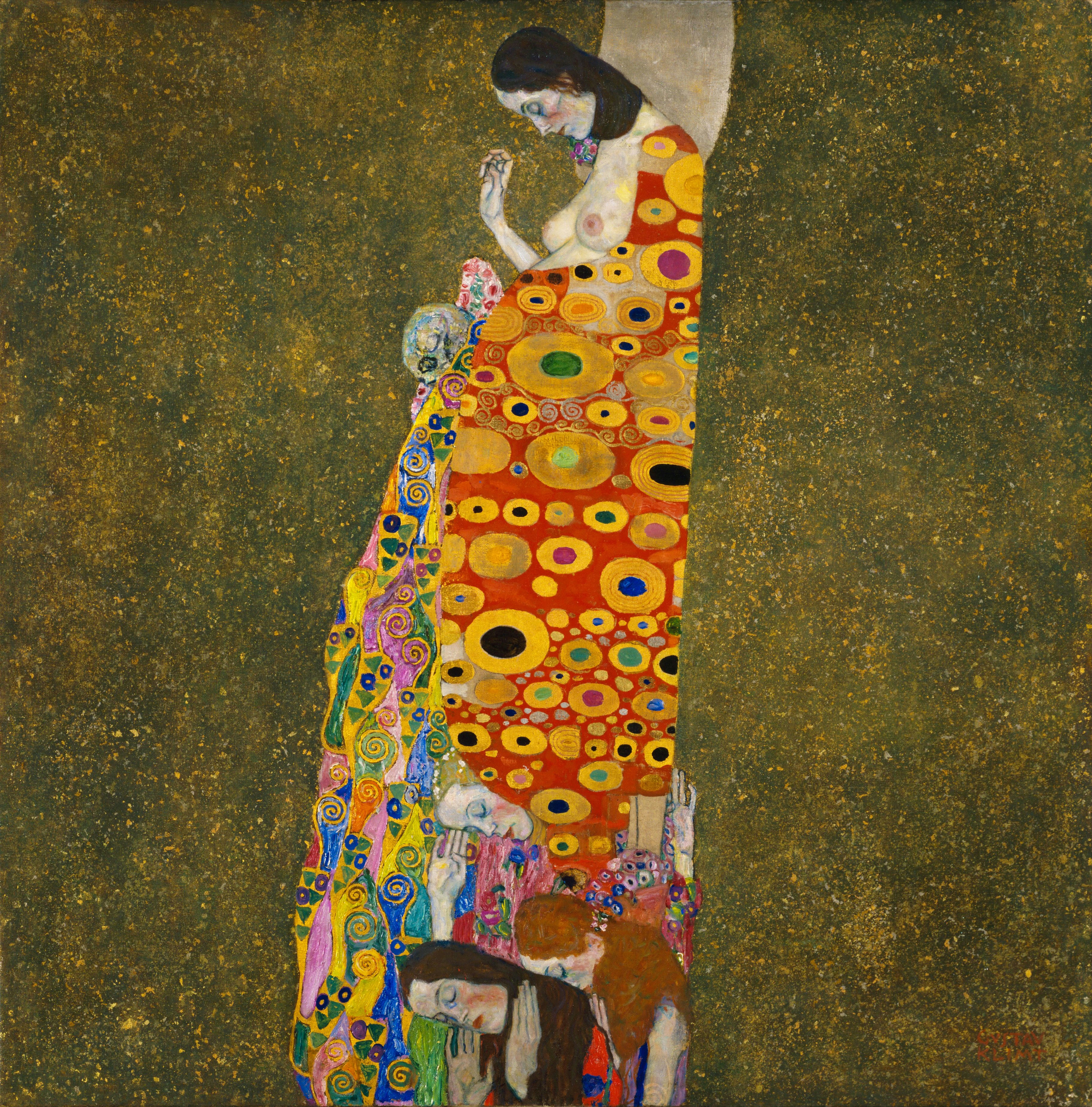
Gustav Klimt, Hope II, 1907-1908

Pablo Picasso. Les Demoiselles d'Avignon, 1907

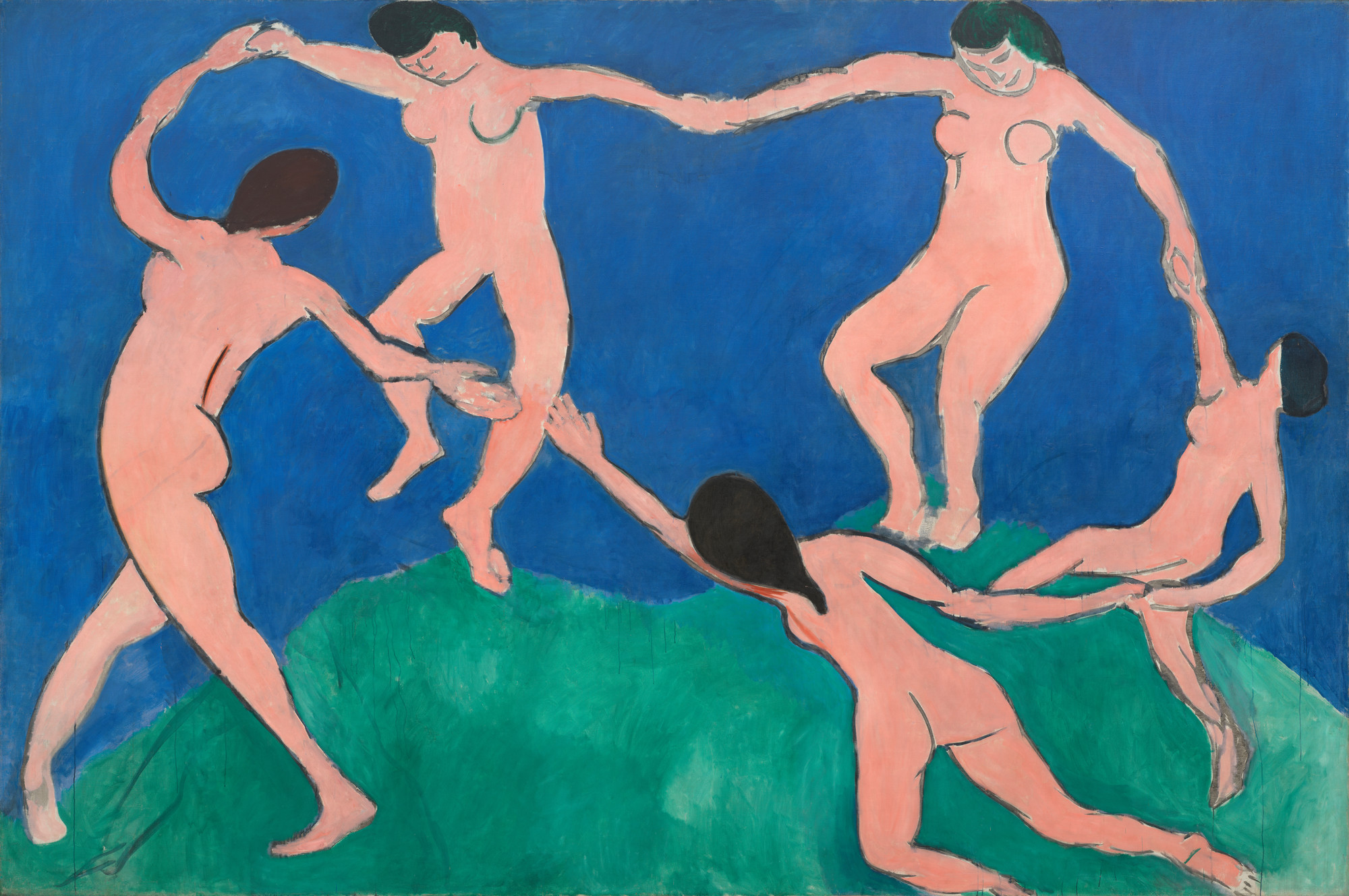
Henri Matisse, The Dance (first version), 1909

==== 1910s gallery ====
Georges Braque, 1911–12, Man with a Guitar (Figure, L'homme à la guitare), oil on canvas, 116.2 x 80.9 cm (45.75 x 31.9 in)

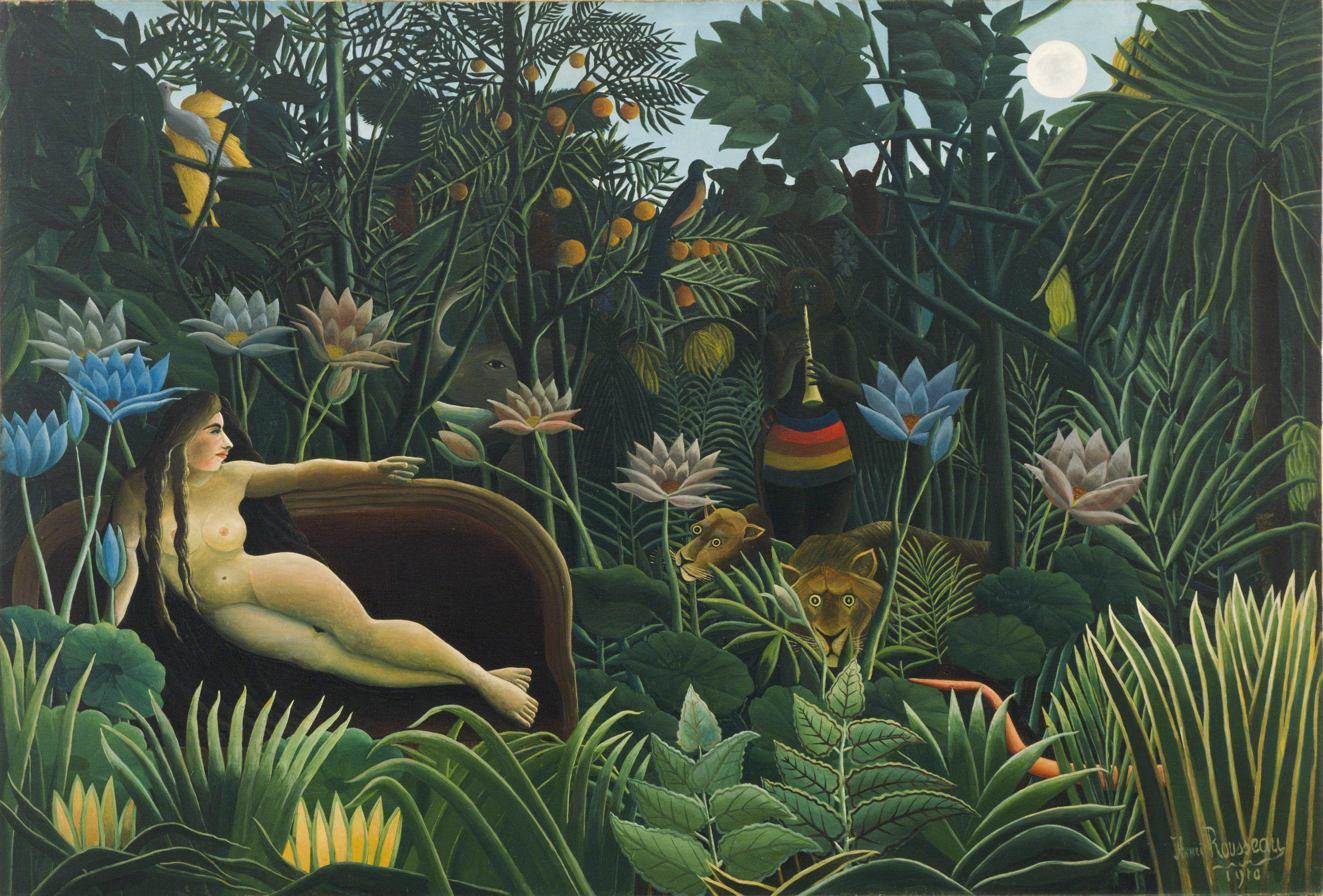
Henri Rousseau, The Dream, 1910

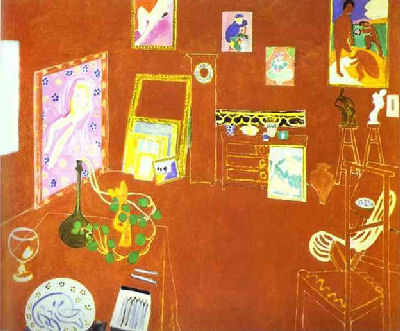
Henri Matisse, L'Atelier Rouge, 1911

Marc Chagall, I and the Village, 1911

Giorgio de Chirico, Love Song, 1914

==== 1920s gallery ====
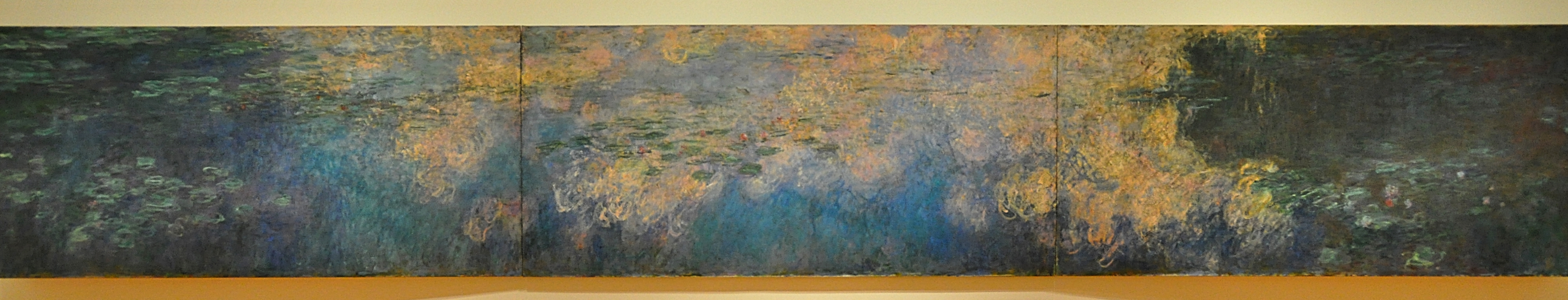
Claude Monet Reflections of Clouds on the Water-Lily Pond, c. 1920

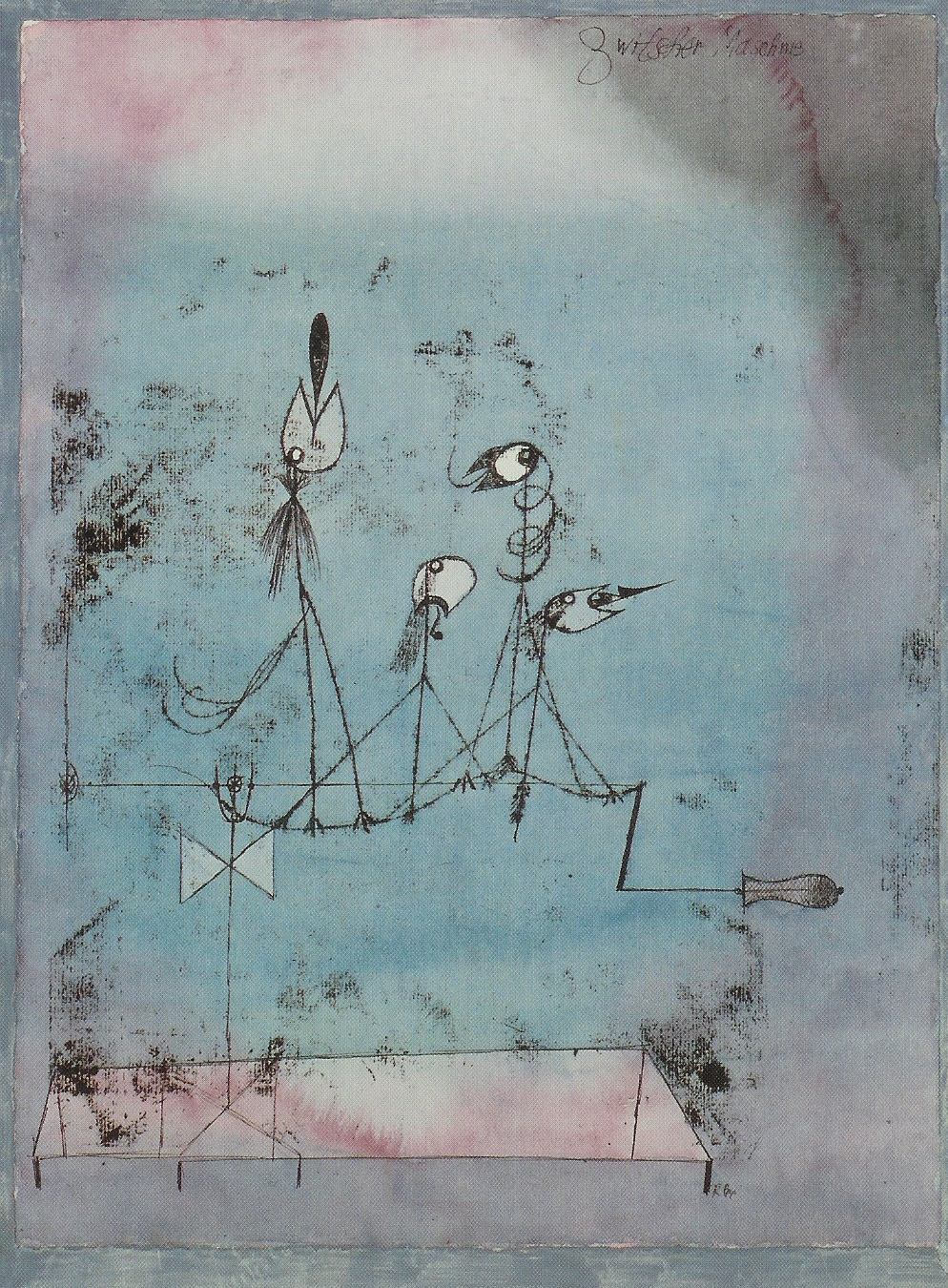
Paul Klee, Twittering Machine, 1922

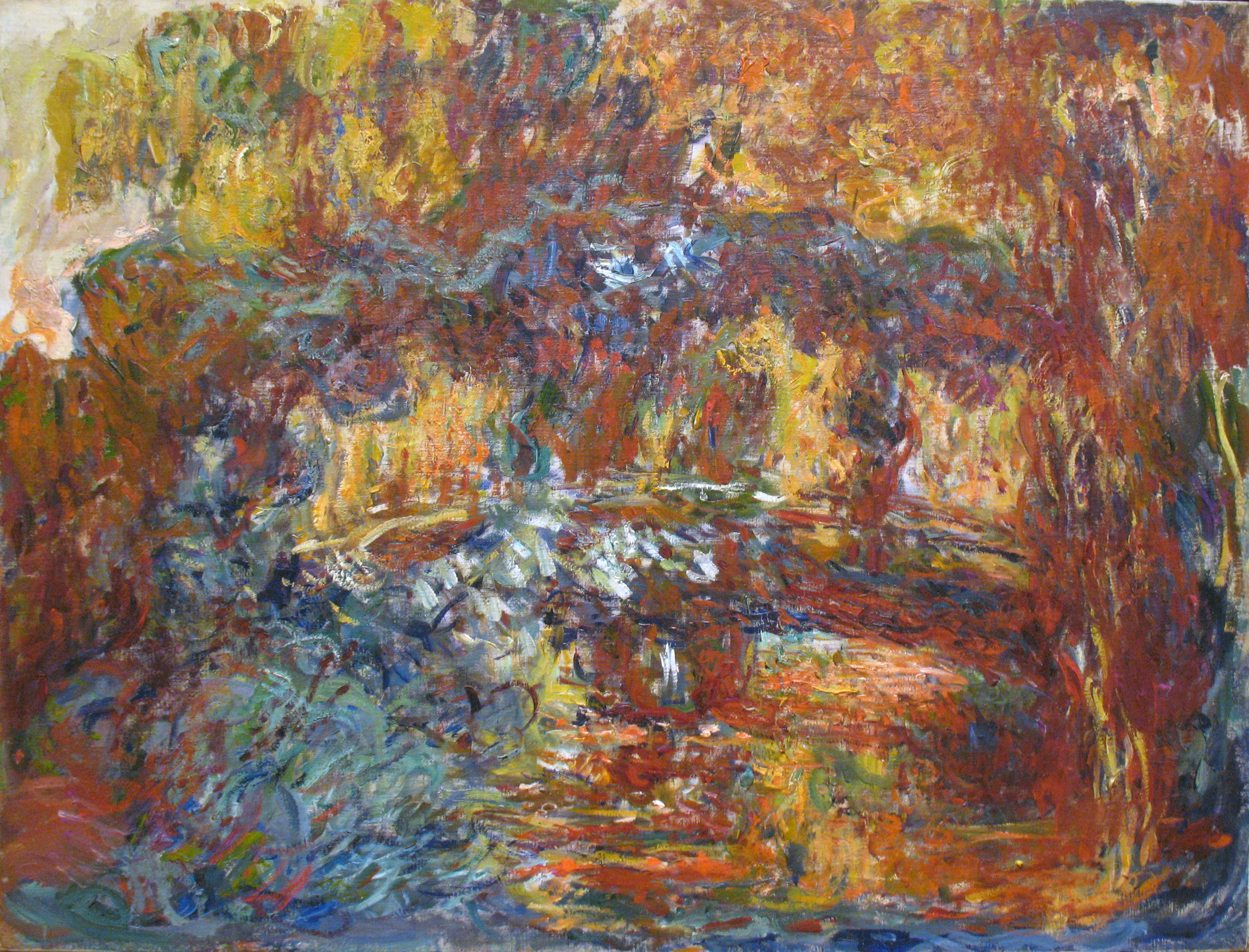
Claude Monet The Japanese Footbridge, 1920-1922

Paul Klee, Fire in the Evening, 1929

==== 1930s gallery ====
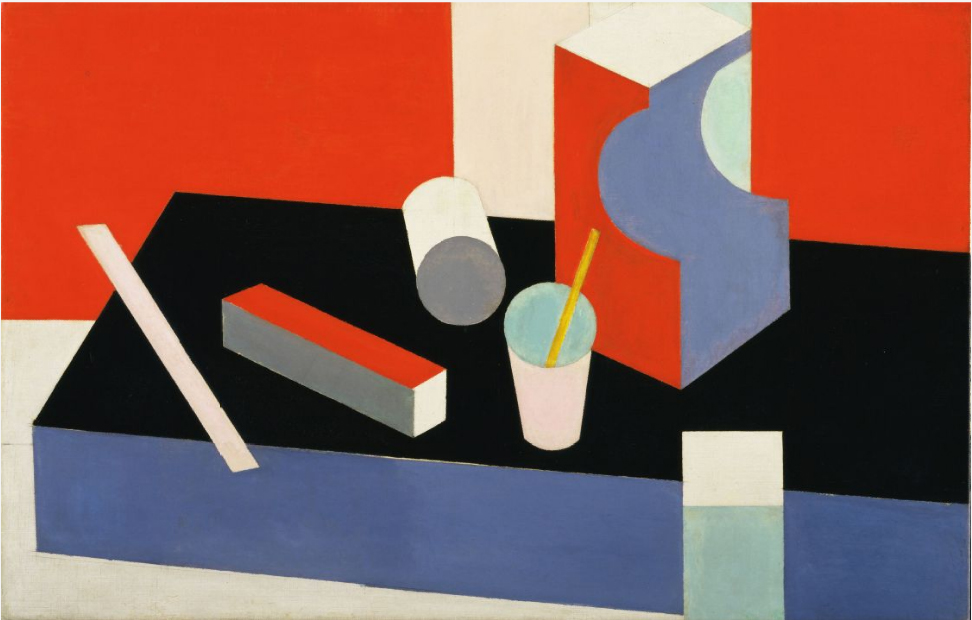
Patrick Henry Bruce, Painting, 1929-1930

== Department of Photography ==
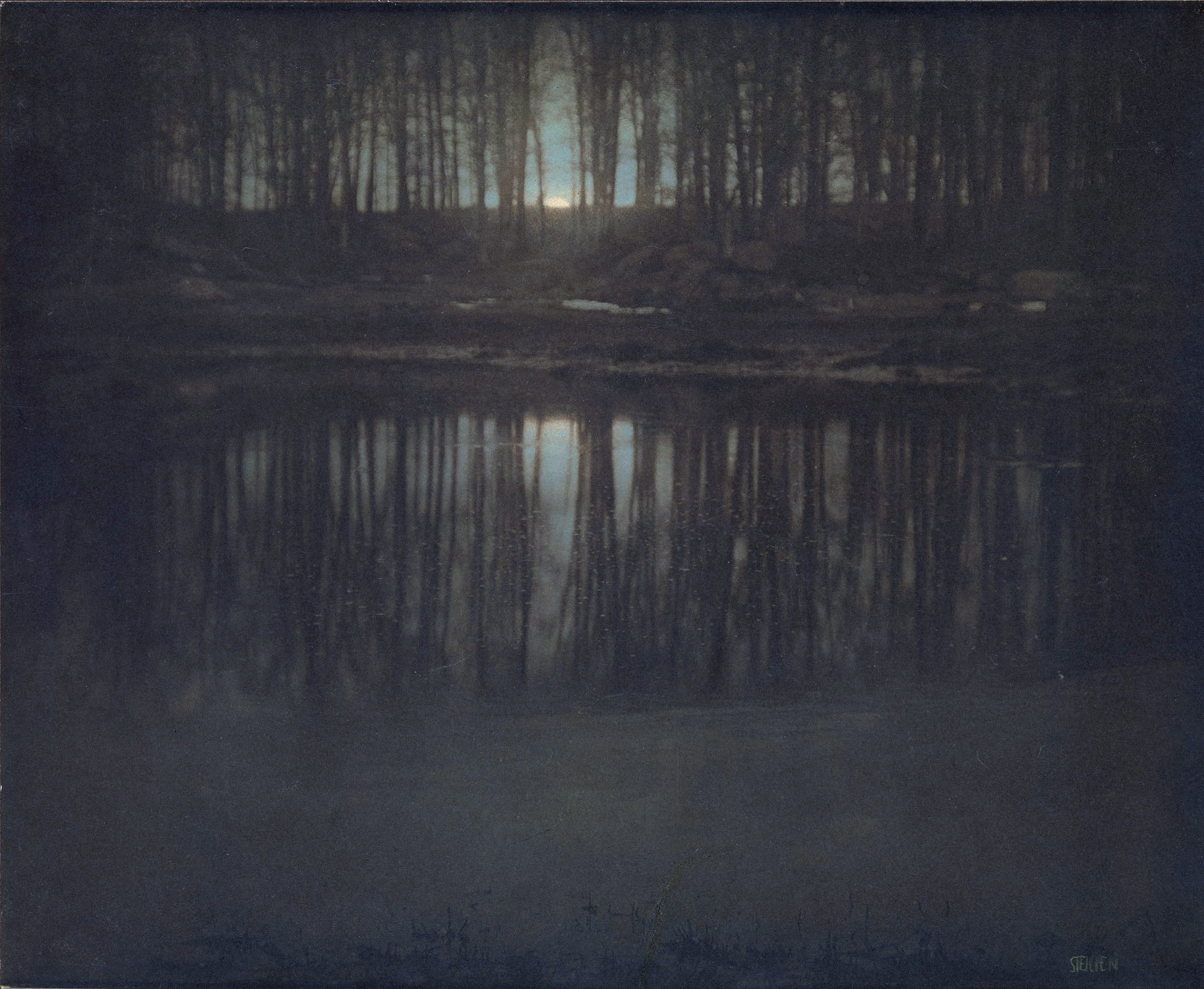

- The Pond—Moonlight. Edward Steichen (1904)

== Department of Architecture and Design ==
This is a partial list of works in MoMA's Department of Architecture and Design, organized by type.

MoMA's Department of Architecture and Design was founded in 1932 as the first museum department in the world dedicated to the intersection of architecture and design. The department's first director was Philip Johnson who served as curator between 1932–34 and 1946–54.

The collection consists of 28,000 works including architectural models, drawings and photographs. One of the highlights of the collection is the Mies van der Rohe Archive. It also includes works from such legendary architects and designers as Frank Lloyd Wright Paul László, the Eameses, Isamu Noguchi, and George Nelson. The design collection contains many industrial and manufactured pieces, ranging from a self-aligning ball bearing to an entire Bell 47D1 helicopter. In 2012, the department acquired a selection of 14 video games, the basis of an intended collection of 40 which is to range from Spacewar! (1962) to Minecraft (2011).

=== Appliances ===
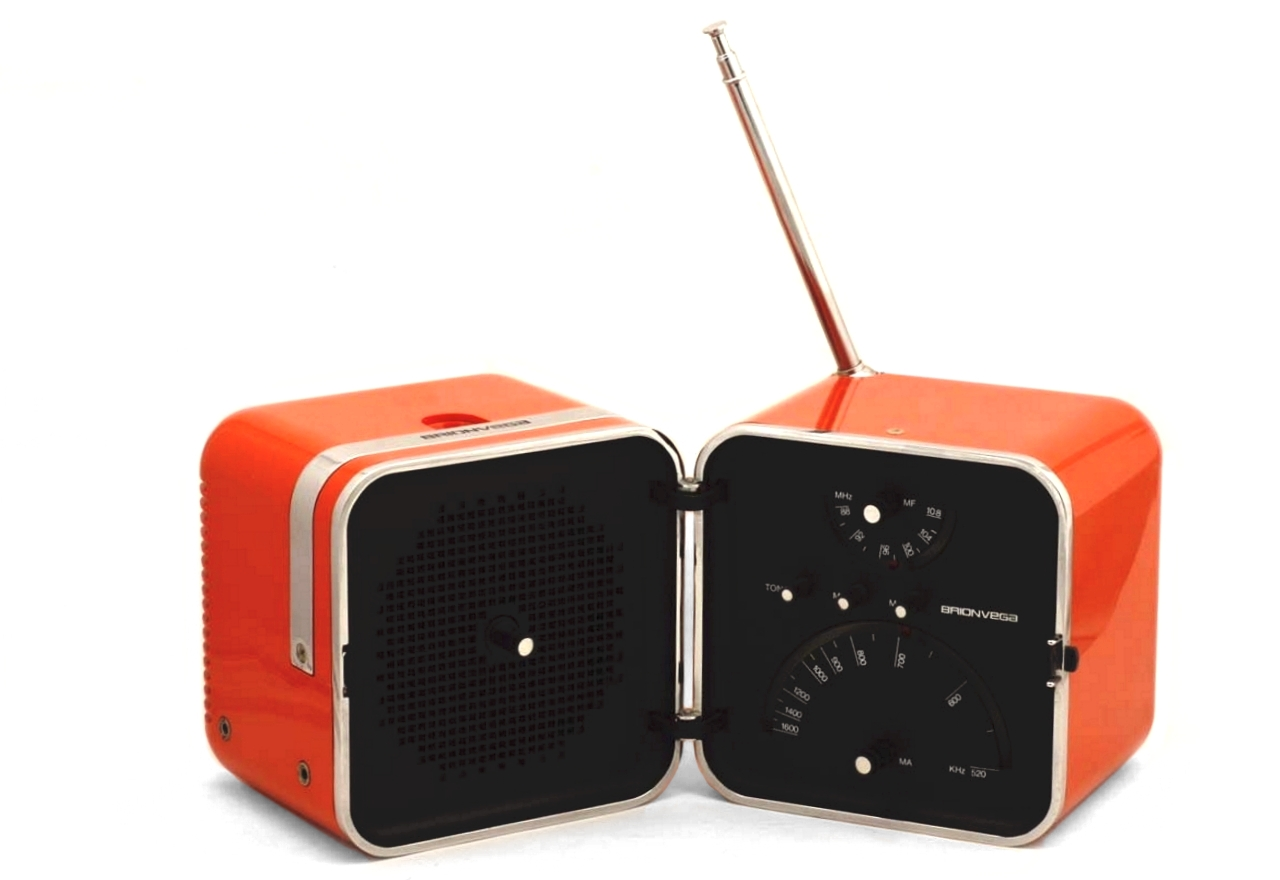
Brionvega TS502 portable radio

- Brionvega TS 502 portable radio (Richard Sapper and Marco Zanuso)
- Cifra 3 flip clock (Gino Valle)
- Grillo telephone (Richard Sapper and Marco Zanuso)
- Moka Express (Otello Amleto Spadini)
- Olivetti Lettera 22 typewriter (Marcello Nizzoli)
- Olivetti Valentine typewriter (Ettore Sottsass et al.)
- Transcriptors Turntable
- Trimline telephone
- Walkman Model TPS-L2 portable audio cassette player

=== Architectural Performance ===
- IKEA Disobedients

=== Architecture ===
- Geodesic dome

=== Automotive ===
- Airstream
- Cisitalia 202
- Ferrari 641
- Jaguar E-Type
- Volkswagen Beetle
- Willys MB
- Smart Fortwo

=== Aviation ===
- Bell 47
- Schiebel Camcopter S-100

=== Furniture ===
- 40/4 Chair
- Aeron chair
- Eames Lounge Chair
- Grete Jalk GJ Chair
- Sacco chair

=== Graphic design ===
The I Love New York logo was designed by Milton Glaser in 1977

NASA Worm logo 1975–1992, re-instated as a secondary logo in 2020

Warming Stripes graphics, first developed in 2018, depict global warming since 1850.

- Classic Mac OS icons
- Doctors Without Borders MUAC "Bracelet of Life" measuring band
- Gotham (typeface)
- I Love New York
- Miller (typeface)
- NASA "Worm" logo and Graphics Standards Manual
- Warming Stripes – Data visualization graphics depicting trends of annual temperature changes

=== Hand-held tools ===
- Bic Cristal
- Headblade
- Maglite
- Post-it note
- Swiss Army knife

=== Industrial components ===
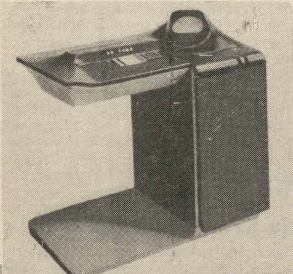
Olivetti TCV 250 video terminal designed by Mario Bellini in 1967

- SKF
- Olivetti TCV 250

=== Lighting ===
- Arco floor lamp
- Parentesi
- Tizio – Counterweight-balanced table lamp

=== Packaging ===
- ClearRx
- Kikkoman

=== Personal computing ===
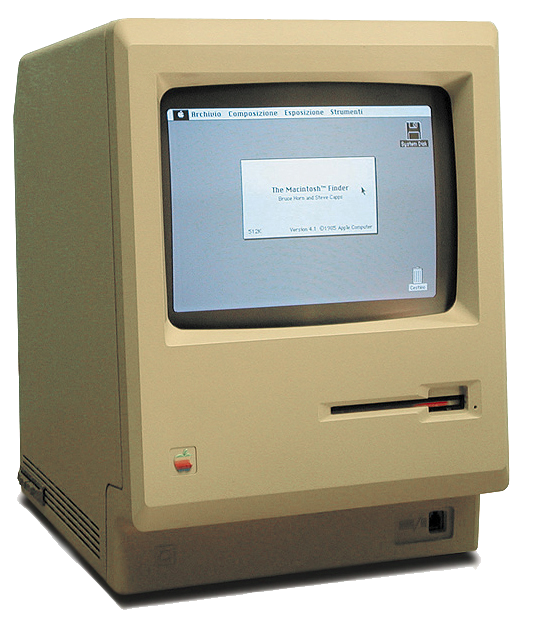
The Macintosh 128K was released by Apple in 1984.

- iMac
- iMac G4
- Macintosh 128K (and the original Mac OS icons)
- Macintosh SE
- Mindset computer

=== Portable computing ===
- Grid Compass
- GridPad
- iPod Classic
- OLPC XO-1
- Sinclair Sovereign
- IBM ThinkPad 701C

=== Photography ===
- Apple QuickTake
- Carousel slide projector
- Given Imaging

=== Toys ===
- AIBO
- Flying disc
- Slinky

=== Video games ===
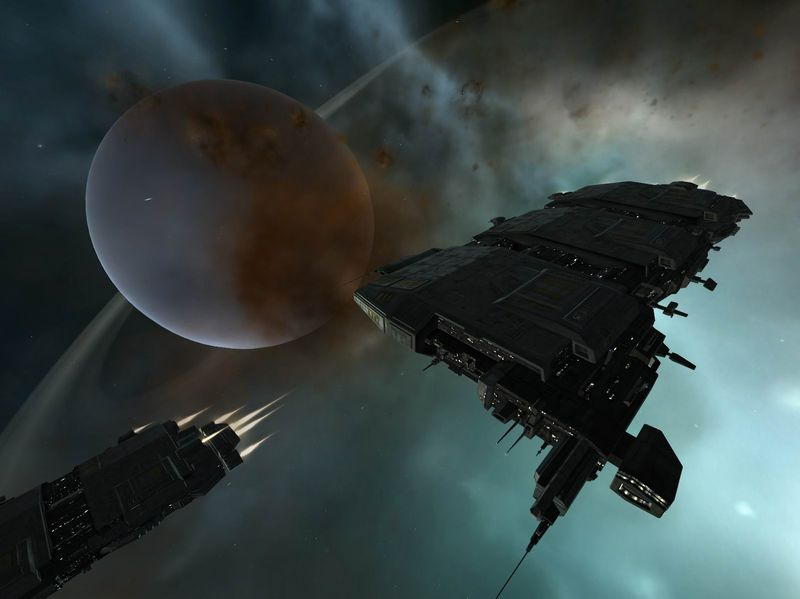
Eve Online is one of the video games acquired by the Museum of Modern Art in 2012.

The Museum of Modern Art acquired Pong in 2013.

In November 2012, the department acquired a selection of 14 video games, the basis of an intended collection of 40. Six more games and one hardware console were acquired in July 2013.

- Magnavox Odyssey (1972)
- Pong (1972)
- Space Invaders (1978)
- Asteroids (1979)
- Pac-Man (1980)
- Tempest (1981)
- Yars' Revenge (1982)
- Tetris (1984)
- Another World (1991)
- Myst (1993)
- SimCity 2000 (1994)
- Vib-Ribbon (1999)
- The Sims (2000)
- Katamari Damacy (2004)
- EVE Online (2003)
- Dwarf Fortress (2006)
- flOw (2006)
- Portal (2007)
- Passage (2008)
- Canabalt (2009)
- Minecraft (2011)
