= Razor =

Device to remove body hair

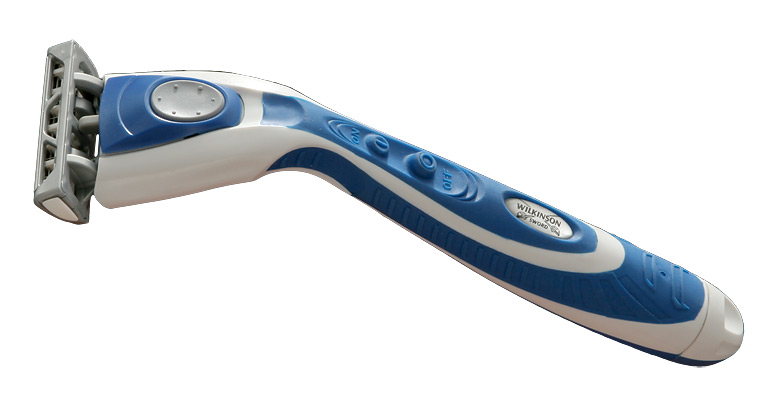
- A modern razor that uses replaceable blade cartridges
- Classification: Personal grooming device
- Types: straight razor; single-edge safety razor; double-edge safety razor; cartridge razor; disposable razor; electric razor
- Used with: Shaving cream, shaving brush, shaving soap
- Related: Electric razor, straight razor

A razor is a bladed tool primarily used in the removal of body hair through the act of shaving. Kinds of razors include straight razors, safety razors, disposable razors, and electric shavers.

While the razor has been in existence since before the Bronze Age (the oldest razor-like object has been dated to 18,000 BC), the most common types of razors currently used are the safety razor and the electric razor.

== History ==
Razors have been identified from many Bronze Age cultures. These were made of bronze or obsidian and were generally oval-shaped, with a small tang protruding from one of the short ends.

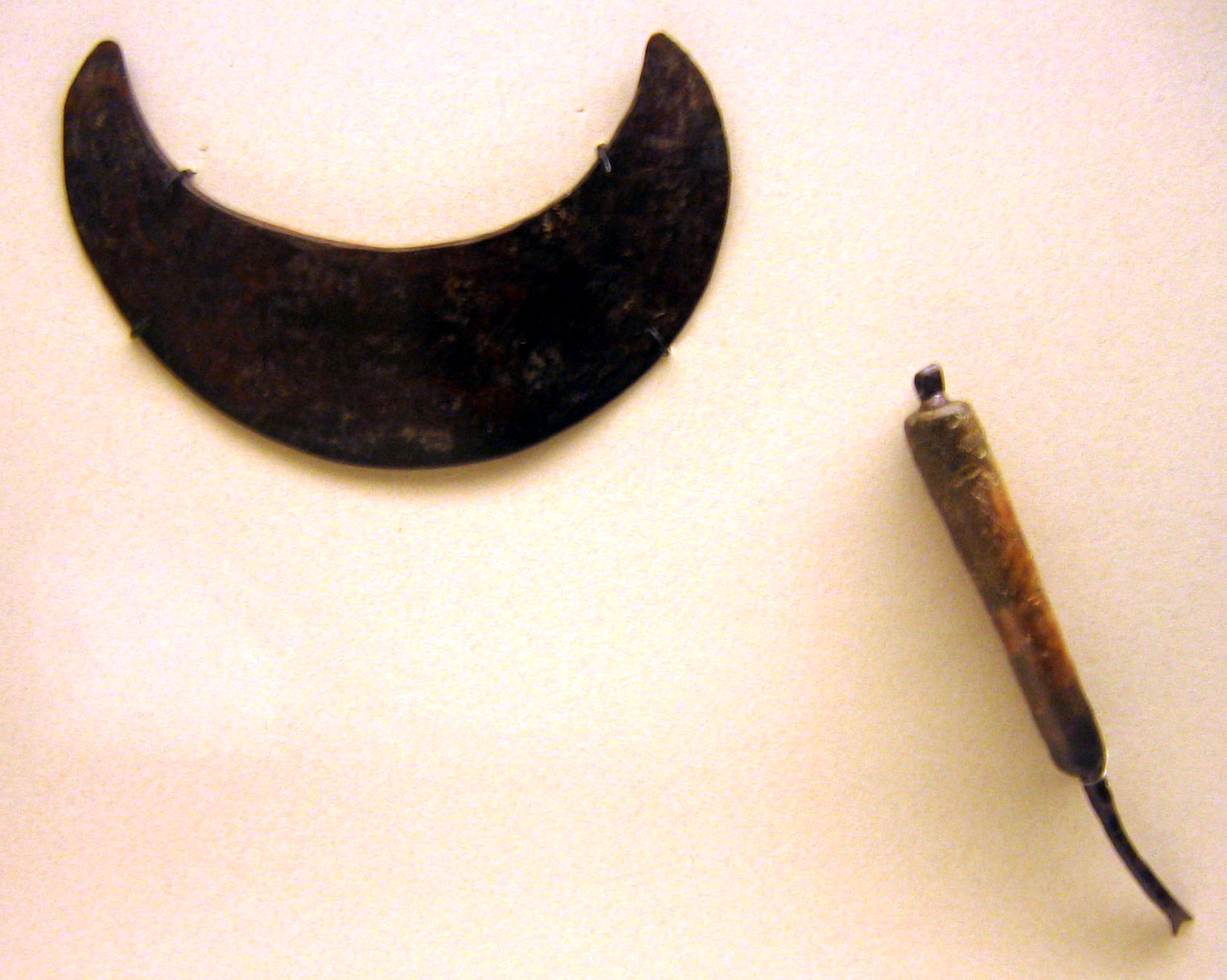
Razor (top) and nail cutter with bone handle (bottom) found in a grave of the Hallstatt culture

Various forms of razors were used throughout history, which were different in appearance but similar in use to modern straight razors. In prehistoric times, items such as clam shells, shark teeth, and flint were sharpened and used to shave with. Drawings of such blades were found in prehistoric caves. Some tribes still use blades made of flint to this day. Excavations in Egypt have unearthed solid gold and copper razors in tombs dating back to the 4th millennium BC. Razors were used and manufactured in Kerma during the Bronze Age.

Several razors, as well as other personal hygiene artifacts, were recovered from Bronze Age burials in northern Europe and are believed to belong to high-status individuals. The Roman historian Livy reported that the razor was introduced in ancient Rome in the 6th century BC by the legendary king Lucius Tarquinius Priscus.

Bronze razor with papyrus stem case, between 1425 and 1353 BC, New Kingdom of Egypt. Museo Egizio, Turin.

The first modern straight razor, complete with decorated handles and hollow-ground blades, was constructed in Sheffield, in England; in the 18th and 19th centuries, England was considered to be the center of the cutlery industry. Benjamin Huntsman produced the first superior hard steel grade, through a special crucible process, suitable for use as blade material in 1740, though it was first rejected in England. Huntsman's process was adopted by the French sometime later, albeit reluctantly at first because of nationalist sentiments. English manufacturers were even more reluctant than the French to adopt the process and only did so after they saw its success in France. Sheffield steel (also called Sheffield silver steel) is a highly polished steel, famous for its deep gloss finish. It is considered to be of superior quality and is still used to this day in France by such manufacturers as Thiers Issard.

In the 18th and 19th centuries, the wealthy had servants to shave them or could visit barbershops. Daily shaving was not a widespread practice in the 19th century; some never shaved at all. The custom of everyday shaving among American men only began after World War I. Men were required to shave daily so their gas masks would fit properly. This became much easier with the introduction of the safety razor, which was standard issue during the war.

Straight razors were the most common form of shaving before the 20th century and remained common in many countries until the 1950s. Barbers were specially trained to give customers a thorough and quick shave, and a collection of straight razors ready for use was a common sight in most barbershops. Modern-day barbers still keep straight razors, but they use them less often.

These new safety razors did not require any serious tutelage to use. The blades were extremely hard to sharpen, were meant to be thrown away after one use, and rusted quickly if not discarded. They also required a smaller initial investment, though they cost more over time. Despite its long-term advantages, the straight razor lost significant market share. As shaving became less intimidating and men began to shave themselves more, the demand for barbers providing straight razor shaves decreased. Though it is unclear when the use of razors became prevalent among both men and women, by the twentieth century gender-specific structural distinctions were clear among offerings.

In 1960, stainless steel blades which could be used more than once became available, reducing the cost of safety-razor shaving. The first such blades were made by the Wilkinson firm, famous maker of ceremonial swords, in Sheffield. Soon Gillette, Schick, and other manufacturers were making stainless steel blades.

These were followed by multiple-blade cartridges and disposable razors. For each type of replaceable blade, there is generally a disposable razor.

In the 1930s, electric razors became available. These can rival the cost of a good straight razor, although the whole straight-razor shaving kit can exceed the cost of even an expensive electric razor.

== Straight razors ==
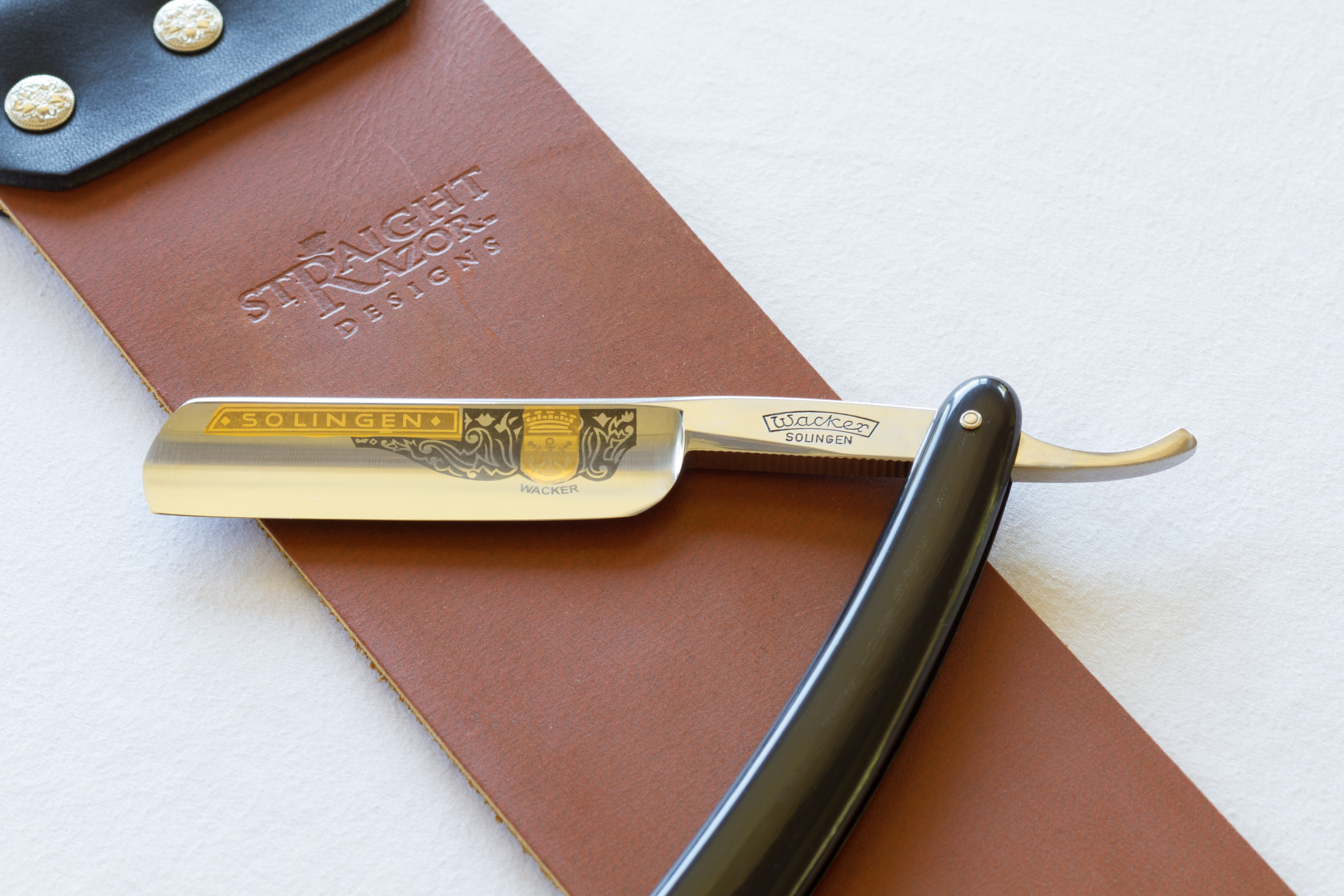
A straight razor on a leather strop

Straight razors with open steel blades, also commonly known as cut-throats, were the most commonly used razors before the 20th century.

Straight razors consist of a blade sharpened on one edge. The blade can be made of either stainless steel, which is slower to hone and strop, but it is easier to maintain since it does not stain easily, or high-carbon steel, which hones and strops quickly and keeps its edge well, but rusts and stains easily if not cleaned and dried promptly. At present, stainless-steel razors are harder to find than carbon steel, but both remain in production.

The blade rotates on a pin through its tang between two protective pieces called scales: when folded into the scales, the blade is protected from damage, and the user is protected. Handle scales are made of various materials, including mother-of-pearl, celluloid, bone, plastic, and wood. Once made of ivory, this has been discontinued, although fossil ivory is used occasionally.

=== Disposable straight razors ===
Disposable straight razors, also known as shavettes, are similar in use and appearance to straight razors, but use disposable blades, either standard double-edged cut in half or specially made single-edge. These shavettes are used in the same way as straight razors, but do not require stropping and honing.

== Safety razors ==
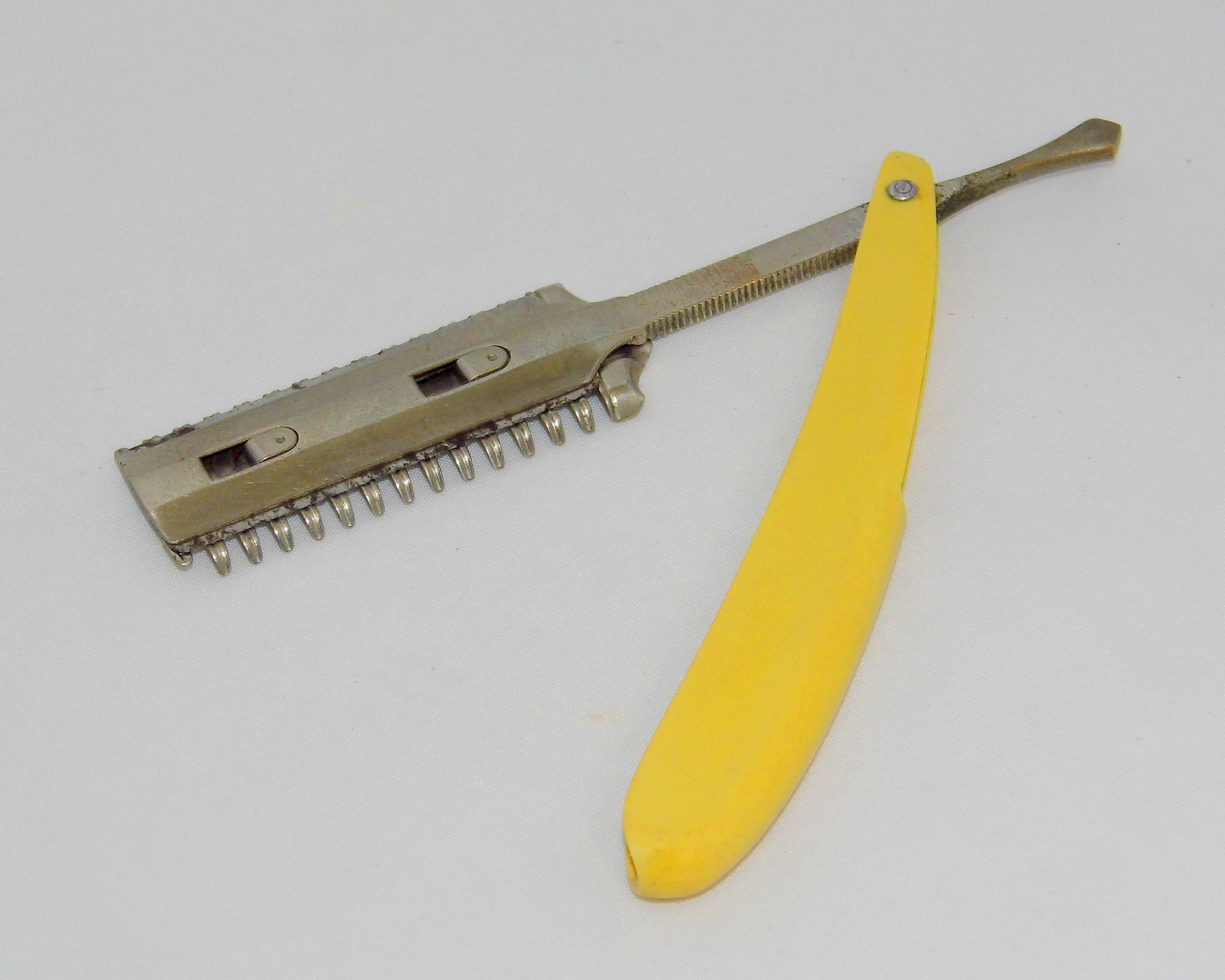
A straight razor with a comb guard and a disposable blade

The first step towards a safer-to-use razor was the guard razor – also called a straight safety razor – which added a protective guard to a regular straight razor. The first such razor was most likely invented by a French cutler Jean-Jacques Perret circa 1762. The invention was inspired by the joiner's plane and was essentially a straight razor with its blade surrounded by a wooden sleeve. The earliest razor guards had comb-like teeth and could only be attached to one side of a razor; a reversible guard was one of the first improvements made to guard razors.

An early description of a safety razor similar in form to the ones used today is found on William Samuel Henson's 1847 patent application for a comb tooth guard. This guard could be attached to a straight razor or to a razor "the cutting blade which is at right angles with the handle, and resembles somewhat the form of a common hoe."

Around 1875, a new design with a smaller blade placed on top of a handle was marketed by the Kampfe Brothers as "the best available shaving method on the market that won’t cut a user, like straight steel razors."

=== Removable-blade razors ===
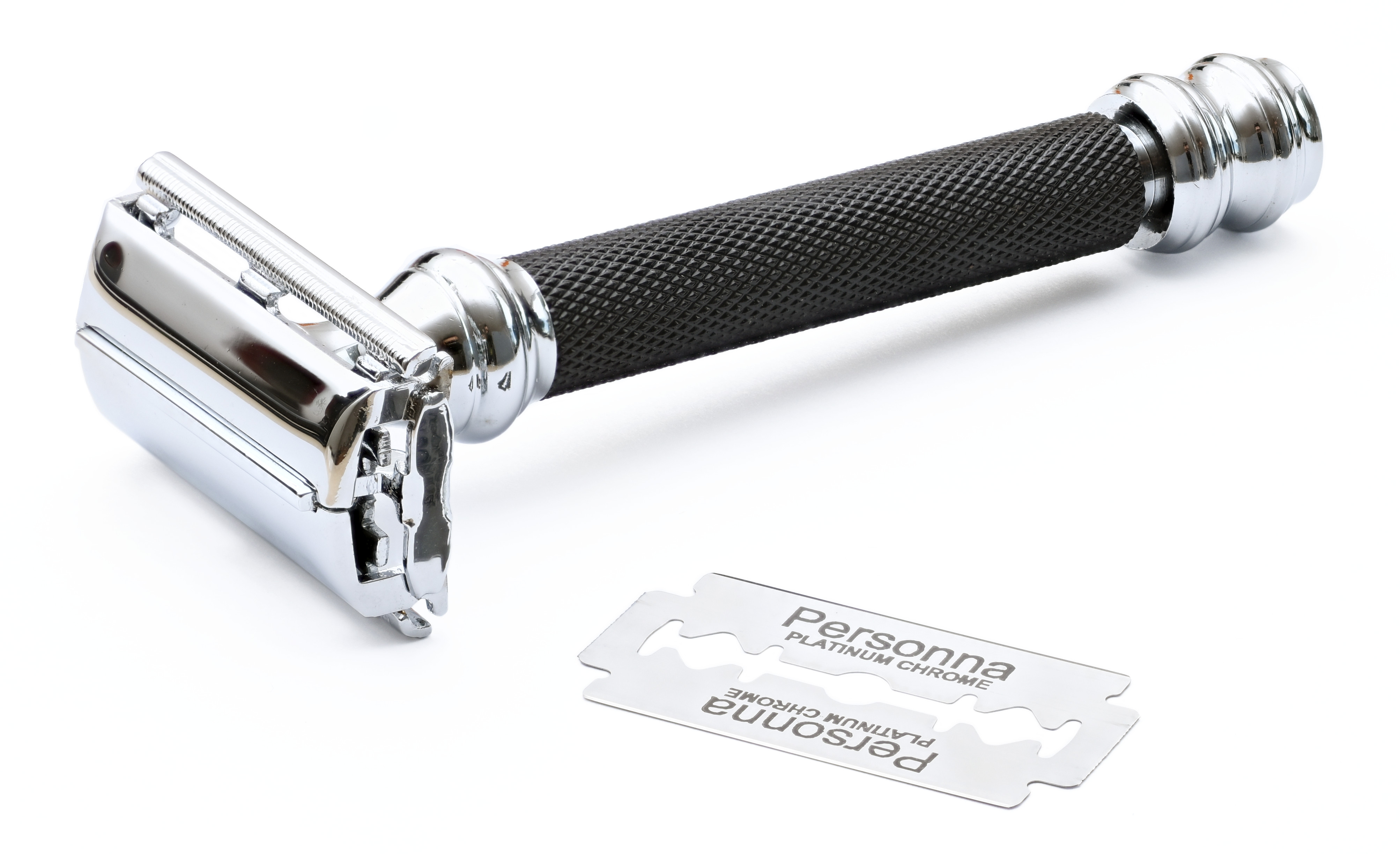
A modern double-edge safety razor and blade

The term safety razor was first used in 1880 and described a basic razor with a handle attached to a head where a removable blade may be placed. The edge was then protected by a comb patterned on the head to protect the skin. In modern-day safety razors, the comb is now more commonly replaced by a safety bar. There are two types of safety razors, single-edged and double-edged. The single-edged razor is essentially a 4-centimetre (1.6 in) long segment of a straight razor. The double-edged safety razor is a razor with a slant bar that can be used on both sides, with two open edges. The blade on the double-edged safety razor is slightly curved to allow for a smoother and cleaner shave.

In 1901, the American inventor King Camp Gillette, with the assistance of William Nickerson, submitted a patent for a new variation of safety razor with disposable blades, which was patented in 1904. One reason was that shaving with a safety razor should be safer and more convenient than shaving with a classic straight razor with a sharp blade. The thick grip of these safety razors can be reused. Gillette realized that a profit could be made by selling an inexpensive razor with disposable blades. This has been called the razor and blades business model, and has become a very common practice for a wide variety of products.

Many other brands of safety razors have come and gone. Much of the competition was based on designing blades that would fit only one style of razor until the blade shape was standardized by the inclusion of a multi-faceted central channel to the blade which would accommodate the various designs of blade securing systems; e.g., three pins, a slender metal bar, etc. Even today, these various securing forms still persist in their variety in DE razors, all accepting the same universal blade design.

==== Razor blade disposal ====
Razor blade slots in bathroom walls were used for razor blade disposal in the early to mid 1900s.

Used razor blades are a form of sharps waste, and present disposal challenges. Blades can be disposed of in a generic sharps container, or in a specialized container, often called a razor blade bank (or "disposal case", "disposal tin", etc.). Various DIY solutions exist, such as plastic pill bottles, or a metal soda can with a slot cut in it.

In the early to mid 1900s, primarily the 1920s to 1960s, a razor blade slot would often be included in a bathroom. Razor blades were inserted through the slot and fell into the space in the wall. These fell out of use with the advent of cartridge razors in the 1960s, and present a danger when renovating buildings of that period.

=== Cartridge razors ===
Exploiting the same razor and blades business model as pioneered in the early 20th century, cartridge razors were developed in the 1960s and are now the most common form of shaving in developed countries. Although designed to have a more ergonomic shape at both the handle and head (including commonly a pivoted head which keeps the blades angled to the skin at a predetermined angle through the shaving motion), the concept is very similar to that of the double-edge razor. However, here, the entire head assembly (a cartridge) is removed and disposed of, not just the blade. It is also common for these cartridge heads to have multiple razor blades set into them, commonly between two and five blades.

In 2023, US-based retailers sold 20 percent fewer razor blades than in 2019.

=== Disposable safety razors ===
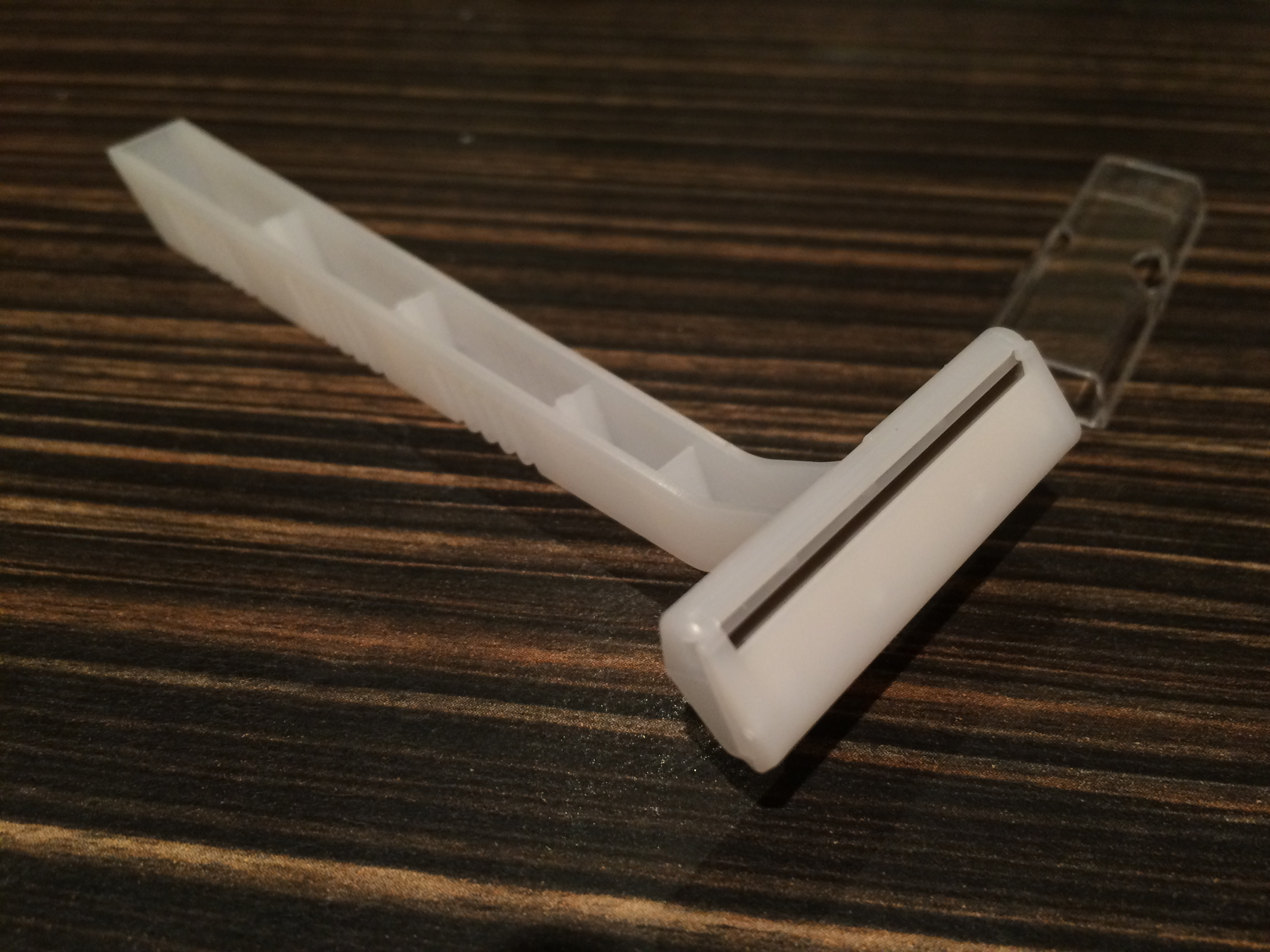
A basic disposable razor

Disposable safety razors are highly similar in design to cartridge razors, constructed from inexpensive materials (most commonly injection-molded polycarbonate), yet are meant to be wholly disposable after use with no blade sharpening or replacement possible. One such device was invented in 1963 by American entertainer and inventor Paul Winchell.

=== Lifespan ===
Safety razor life may be extended by drying the blades after use.

== Electric razors ==
The electric razor (also known as an electric dry shaver) has a rotating or oscillating blade. Its use typically does not require the use of shaving cream, soap, or water. The razor may be powered by a small DC motor, which is either powered by batteries or mains electricity. Many modern-day models are powered using rechargeable batteries. Alternatively, some models use an electro-mechanical oscillator driven by an AC-energized solenoid. Some early mechanical shavers had no electric motor and had to be powered by hand.

The first electric razor was invented by John F. O'Rourke in 1898. Industrial production of electric razor machines started in 1937 by the US company Remington Rand based on the patent of Jacob Schick from 1928. Since 1939 the Dutch company Philips has produced electric razor machines. One of the main differences between electric razors is the shaving technology they use. Usually, electric shaving machines use several round rotating shaving blades or a horizontally shaver’s foil and cutter block technology.

== Other razors ==
Thick, rigid, single-edged razors such as utility knives are used for various hand-held tasks. Applications include detailed carpentry work like sanding and scraping (in a specialized holder), paper cutting for technical drawing, plumbing, and finish work such as grouting and cleaning, and removing paint from flat surfaces such as panes of glass. Unlike shaving razors, the industrial-grade blades used in these tools are usually made from non-stainless steel, like carbon steel, and have a tougher and duller edge.

A lame is a razor used in bread production to slash the surface of an unbaked loaf.

A razor, in the video editing software Adobe Premiere, is used to split a video clip into two distinct instances.

== See also ==
- Hair clipper
- Headblade
- Razor blade steel
- Philosophical razor
