= Sinclair Sovereign =

Calculator produced by Sinclair Radionics

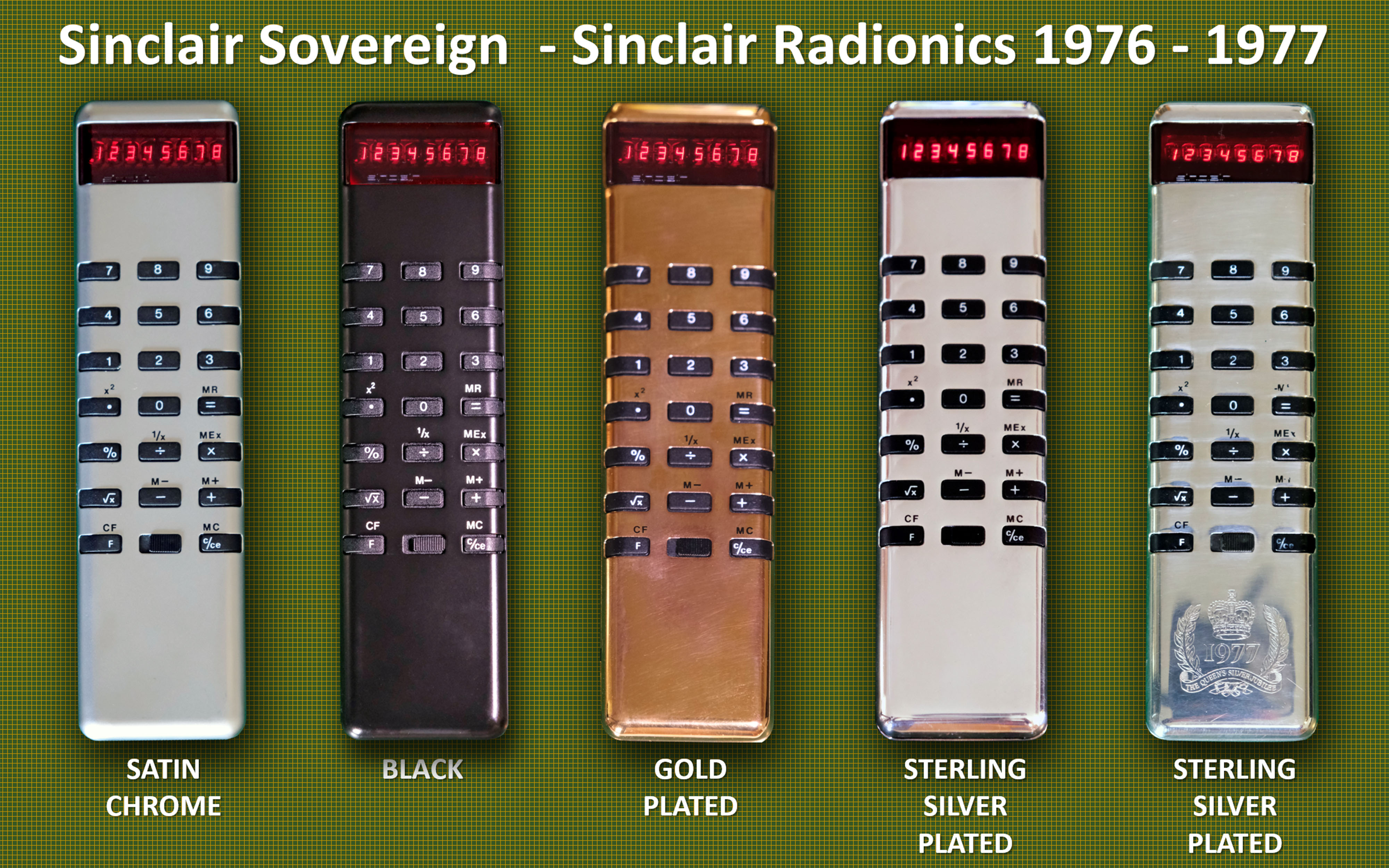
- Manufacturer: Sinclair Research
- Introduced: 1976

Calculator
- Display type: Light-emitting diode
- Display size: 8 digits

CPU
- Processor: Mostek MK50321N

Other
- Power supply: 2x 1.35V button cells
- Dimensions: 36 by 141 by 12 millimetres (1.42 in × 5.55 in × 0.47 in)

The Sinclair Sovereign was a high-end calculator introduced by Clive Sinclair's company Sinclair Radionics in 1976. It was an attempt to escape from the unprofitable low end of the market, and one of the last calculators Sinclair produced. Made with a case of pressed steel that a variety of finishes, it cost between £30 and £60 at a time when other calculators could be purchased for under £5. A number of factors meant that the Sovereign was not a commercial success, including the cost, high import levies on components, competition from cheaper calculators manufactured abroad, and the development of more power-efficient designs using liquid-crystal displays. Though it came with a five-year guarantee, issues such as short battery life limited its usefulness. The company moved on to producing computers soon afterwards.

The design by John Pemberton won a Design Council award, and there are examples of the Sovereign in the Museum of Modern Art in New York. It had a Mostek MK50321N main integrated circuit and a small memory register, a LED display, and could perform a variety of a number of basic mathematical operations besides four-function arithmetic.

== History ==
The Sovereign was one of the last calculators produced during Sinclair's foray into the calculator market that had started with the Sinclair Executive in September 1972. The Executive had retailed for £80 when introduced, but in little over a year it was possible to purchase a Sinclair calculator for £20 and by November 1976 a model was available for £4.95. Cheaper calculators with liquid-crystal displays instead of light-emitting diodes were becoming more popular, and had much longer battery lives of months or years. Such calculators were available for well under £10, with all the functionality of the more expensive models. The impossibility of selling "simple" calculators profitably led Sinclair to introduce models such as the Cambridge Scientific, introduced in August 1975 at a price of £29.95.

The Sovereign, released in 1976, represented an attempt to move upmarket in an increasingly saturated market. In December 1976, the chrome plated version of the Sovereign cost £30 and the gold-plated version £60, including VAT, but profit margins on the Sovereign were so small that Sinclair ended up selling the Sovereign at a loss, and it was not a commercial success. The Sovereign was made in England, like every other Sinclair calculator except the President.

Sinclair would shortly stop producing calculators and instead focus on computers, starting with the MK14 in 1977. The loss of the calculator market was due in part to technological development leading to smaller and cheaper components, which put heavy pressure on profit margins. An import levy of up to 17.5% was placed on components, but the duty for calculators imported from Japan or Hong Kong could be as little as 5%, making it unprofitable to produce calculators in the UK. Sinclair also had some problems with the reliability of earlier calculators that had adversely affected its reputation, but the Sovereign was sold with a "full and unconditional" five year guarantee.

== Design ==
The Sovereign came in satin chrome and gold-plated models, with leather pouches and fitted wooden cases. It had an 8-digit seven-segment display that used red light-emitting diodes, with a decimal point to the right of each digit that could be illuminated as necessary. Power was provided by two 1.35 mercury button cells. The Sovereign measured 36 by 141 by 12 millimetres (1.42 in × 5.55 in × 0.47 in), which made it small and sleek compared to other calculators of the time.

The Sovereign was unusual because the casing was made from pressed steel, which gave it a much higher quality feel compared to injection moulded plastic. This allowed a variety of paint and plating options, including black painted, chrome-plated, silver-plated, and gold-plated, and a limited edition silver-plated version, inscribed to commemorate the Silver Jubilee of Queen Elizabeth II in 1977, were also produced. Asprey of London was rumoured to have produced two Sovereigns in solid gold, costing £2,750 each.

The design, by John Pemberton, won the Design Council Award in 1977, as the Executive had in 1973, and there are examples in the collection of the Museum of Modern Art in New York. Sovereigns are highly collectible, and used models command high prices.

=== Functions ===
As well as addition, subtraction, multiplication and division, it had reciprocal and square-root functions, and the ability to multiply by a fixed constant. With an eight-digit display, the calculator could display positive numbers between 0.0000001 and 99,999,999, and negative numbers between -0.000001 and -9,999,999. Calculators of the time tended to have displays of between 3 and 12 digits, as reducing the number of digits was an effective way of reducing the cost of the calculator. A number outside that range leads to an overflow, and the screen flashes and all keys except the clear key are rendered inoperable to inform the user of the error. An independent memory register could read information from the screen, and information could only be taken from the memory onto the screen. Five keys were used for memory operations.

The Sovereign used a Mostek MK50321N main integrated circuit, the same as the Sinclair Wrist Calculator and some variants of the Sinclair Cambridge. Clive Sinclair had assumed that people would prefer attractive illuminated LED displays to LCD displays, which incidentally also required more expensive CMOS chips. However, his calculators were designed with the assumption they would be turned off between calculations, which did not prove to be the case. Advertisements suggested that the batteries would last "about a year" under normal use, but in reality the small button cell batteries and comparatively high power consumption meant a short battery life compared to the competition.
