= HeadBlade =

American brand of head-shaving razor

HeadBlade Company
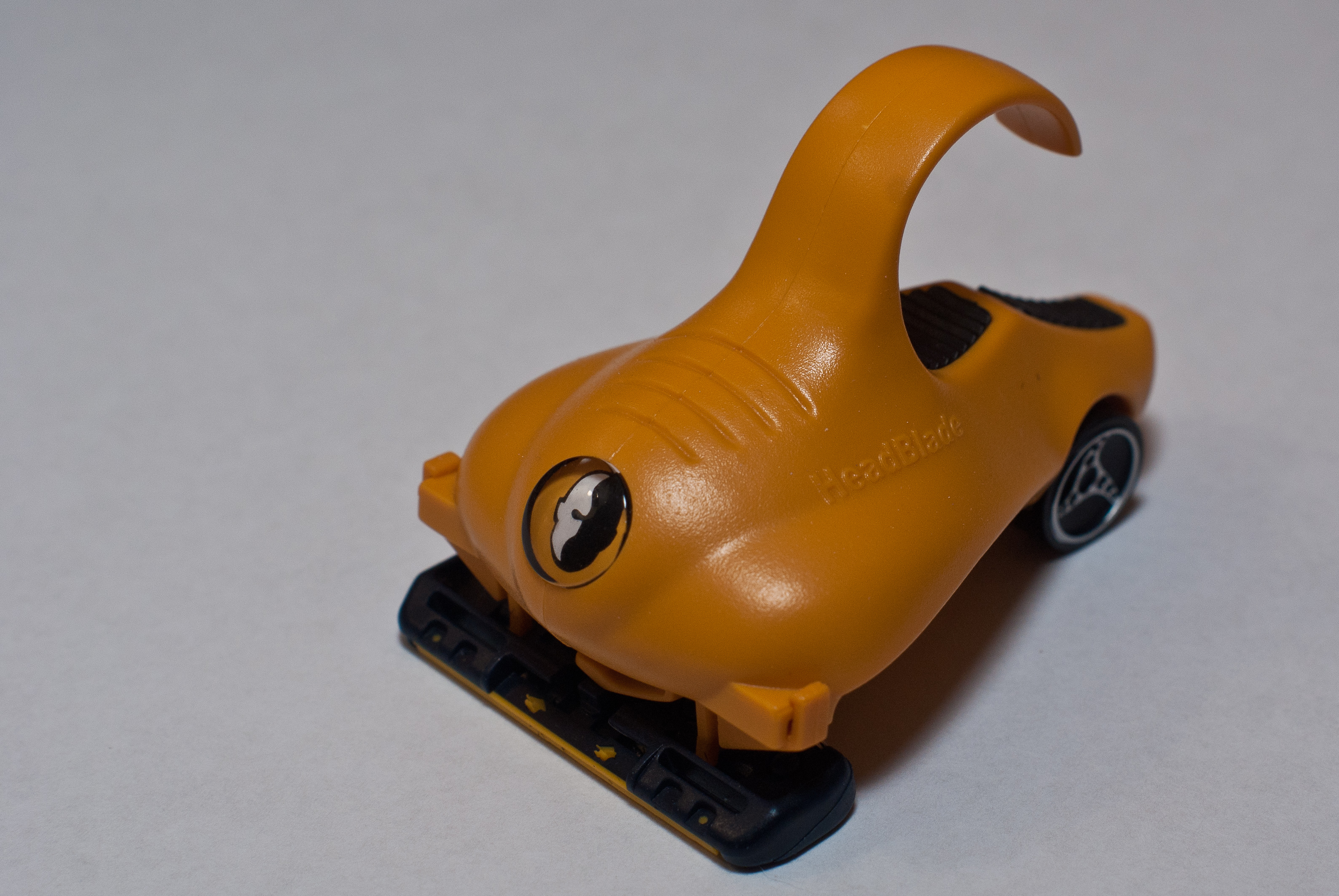
- Founded: 1997
- Headquarters: Gardena, CA
- Key people: Todd Greene
- Website: www.headblade.com

HeadBlade is a head shaving razor brand produced by The HeadBlade Company. Founded by Todd Greene, a 1989 graduate of Bowdoin College, HeadBlade is headquartered in Gardena, California.

== Products ==
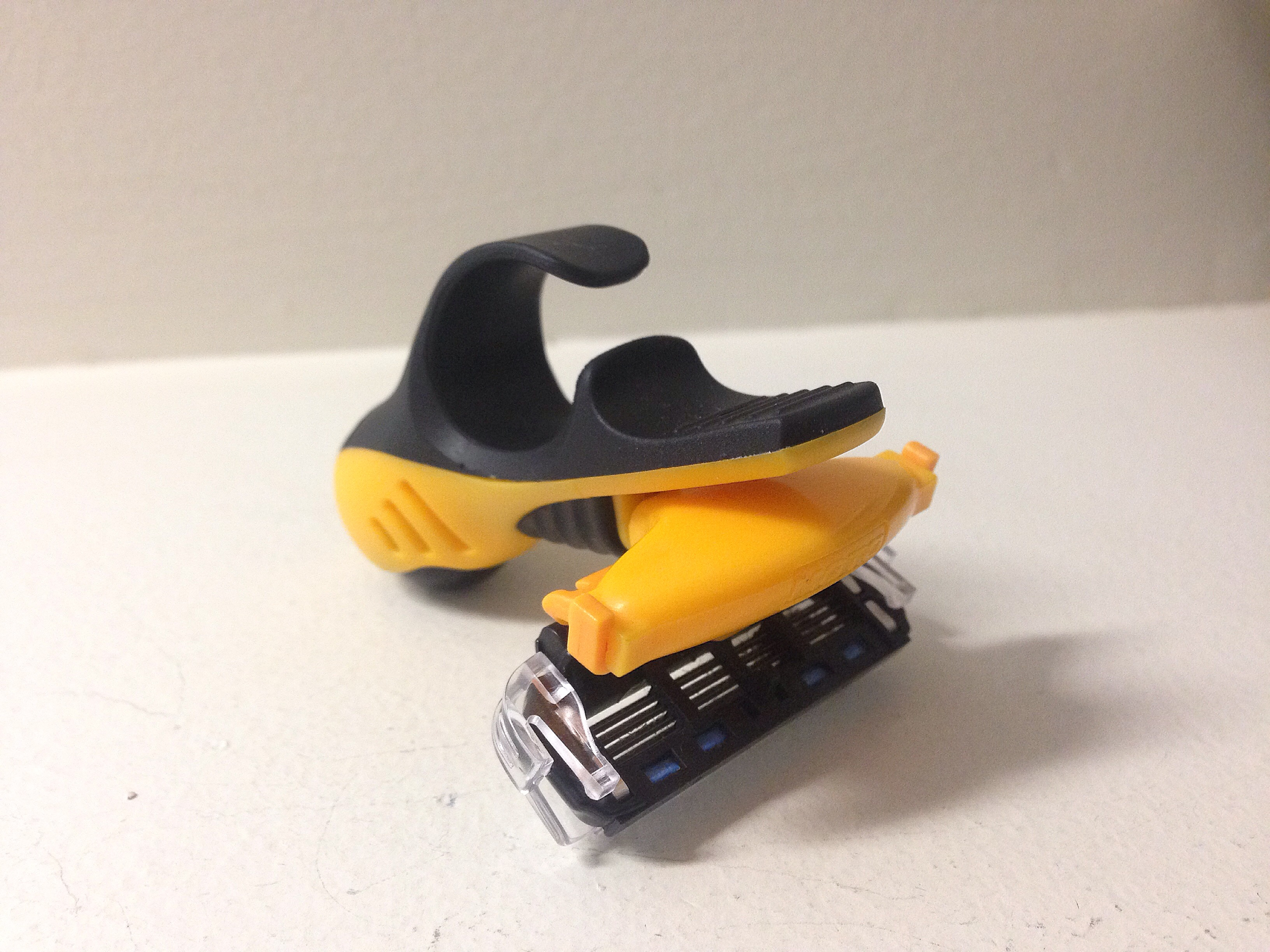
The HeadBlade MOTO

HeadBlade's first commercial product was the HeadBlade Classic, introduced in 1999. The unorthodox design of the Classic was made as a response to the difficulties of head shaving with a regular razor.

The HeadBlade Classic went on to win the IDSA Silver Award for Design Excellence, as well as a spot in Time magazine's “Ten Best Designs of 2000.” In 2005, the Classic was also added to the Permanent Collection at the Museum of Modern Art.

As the company began to grow, HeadBlade expanded into a variety of hair care products, including HeadSlick, a specially designed shaving cream, HeadShed Scrub, an exfoliating solution and HeadLube, a scalp moisturizing lotion. Greene also continued improving on the design of his original product.

In 2006, seven years after first introducing the Classic, HeadBlade released the HeadBlade Sport. The Sport kept the same general shape and function as the classic, but added an improved rubber grip to the finger ring and upper pad. Inspired by sport car design, it also added hardened rubber wheels and an improved axel to increase the mobility of the razor.

In 2012, HeadBlade came out with the HeadBlade ATX. With a design inspired by an all-terrain vehicle, the ATX changed the position of the blade to the back of the razor, encouraging action by “pulling” the blade along the head rather than “pushing” it. This was done in order to reduce the learning curve for people who were accustomed to regular razors.

The latest HeadBlade model is the HeadBlade MOTO, which was released in late 2016. The MOTO was awarded a Red Dot Design Award in 2017 for its industrial design and its ease of use.

GQ magazine named Todd Greene to the 2010 Bald 100.
