= Flat-panel display =

Electronic display technology

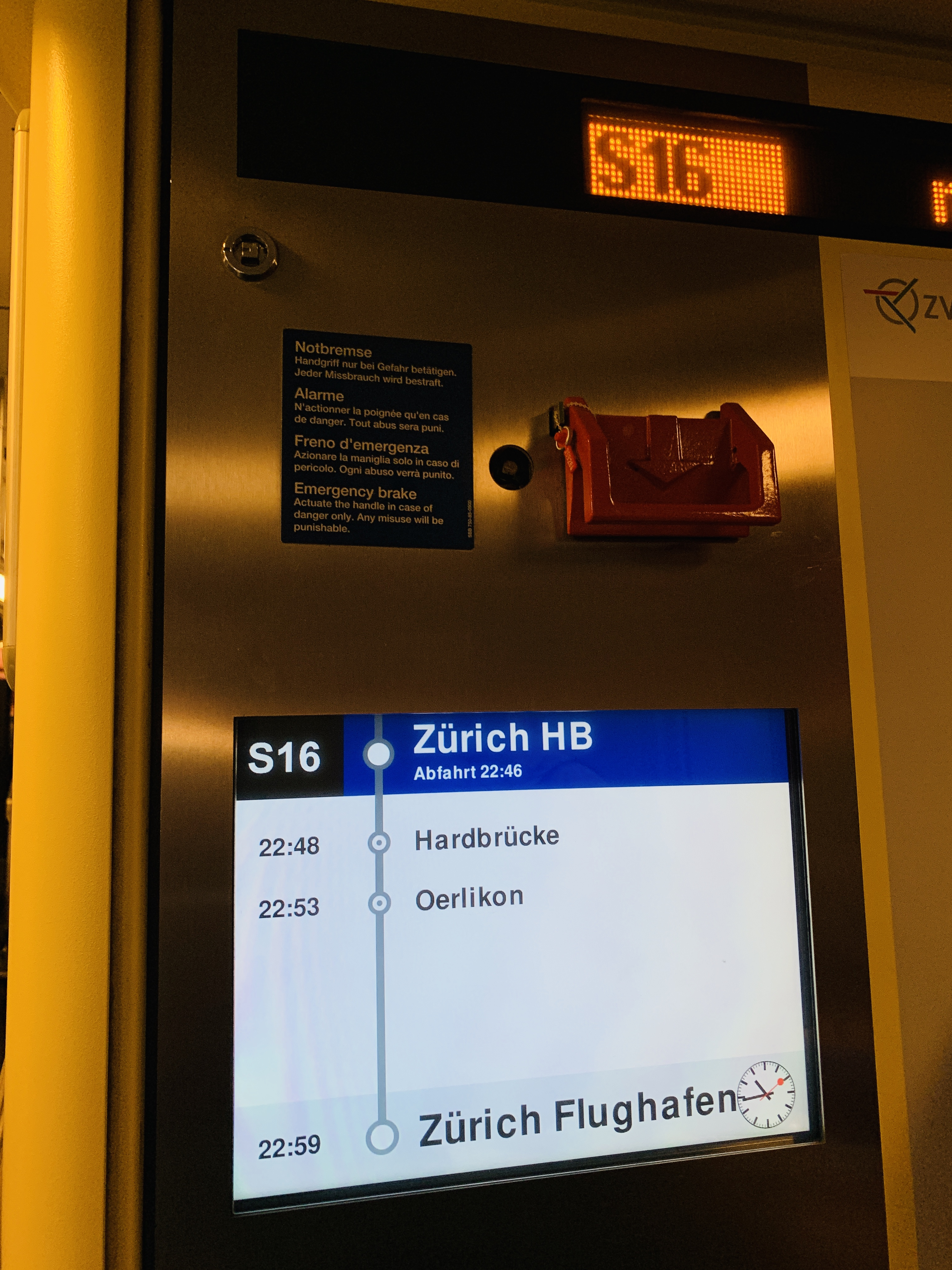
Information on two types of flat-panel display inside a Swiss commuter train: an orange LED display showing the train number (S16, top right) and a LCD screen showing the current location and upcoming stops (bottom)

A flat-panel display (FPD) is an electronic display used to display visual content such as text or images. It is present in consumer, medical, transportation, and industrial equipment.

Flat-panel displays are thin, lightweight, provide better linearity and are capable of higher resolution and contrast than typical consumer-grade TVs from earlier eras. They are usually less than 10 centimetres (3.9 in) thick. While the highest resolution for consumer-grade CRT televisions is 1080i, many interactive flat panels in the 2020s are capable of 1080p and 4K resolution.

In the 2010s, portable consumer electronics such as laptops, mobile phones, and portable cameras have used flat-panel displays since they consume less power and are lightweight. By 2016, flat-panel displays had almost completely replaced CRT displays.

Most 2010s-era flat-panel displays use LCD or light-emitting diode (LED) technologies, sometimes combined. Most LCD screens are back-lit with color filters used to display colors. In many cases, flat-panel displays are combined with touch screen technology, which allows the user to interact with the display in a natural manner. For example, modern smartphone displays often use OLED panels, with capacitive touch screens.

Flat-panel displays can be divided into two display device categories: volatile and static. The former requires that pixels be periodically electronically refreshed to retain their state (e.g. liquid-crystal displays (LCD)), and can only show an image when it has power. On the other hand, static flat-panel displays rely on materials whose color states are bistable, such as displays that make use of e-ink technology, and as such retain content even when power is removed.

== History ==
The first engineering proposal for a flat-panel TV was by General Electric in 1954 as a result of its work on radar monitors. The publication of their findings gave all the basics of future flat-panel TVs and monitors. But GE did not continue with the R&D required and never built a working flat panel at that time. The first production flat-panel display was the Aiken tube, developed in the early 1950s and produced in limited numbers in 1958. This saw some use in military systems as a heads up display and as an oscilloscope monitor, but conventional technologies overtook its development. Attempts to commercialize the system for home television use ran into continued problems and the system was never released commercially.

Dennis Gabor, better known as the inventor of holography, patented a flat-screen CRT in 1958. This was substantially similar to Aiken's concept, and led to a years-long patent battle. By the time the lawsuits were complete, with Aiken's patent applying in the US and Gabor's in the UK, the commercial aspects had long lapsed, and the two became friends. Around this time, Clive Sinclair came across Gabor's work and began an ultimately unsuccessful decade-long effort to commercialize it.

The Philco Predicta featured a relatively flat (for its day) cathode-ray tube setup and would be the first commercially released "flat panel" upon its launch in 1958; the Predicta was a commercial failure. The plasma display panel was invented in 1964 at the University of Illinois, according to The History of Plasma Display Panels.

=== Liquid-crystal displays (LC displays, or LCDs) ===
The MOSFET (metal–oxide–semiconductor field-effect transistor, or MOS transistor) was invented by Mohamed M. Atalla and Dawon Kahng at Bell Labs in 1959, and presented in 1960. Building on their work, Paul K. Weimer at RCA developed the thin-film transistor (TFT) in 1962. It was a type of MOSFET distinct from the standard bulk MOSFET. The idea of a TFT-based LCD was conceived by Bernard J. Lechner of RCA Laboratories in 1968. B.J. Lechner, F.J. Marlowe, E.O. Nester and J. Tults demonstrated the concept in 1968 with a dynamic scattering LCD that used standard discrete MOSFETs.

The first active-matrix addressed electroluminescent display was made using TFTs by T. Peter Brody's Thin-Film Devices department at Westinghouse Electric Corporation in 1968. In 1973, Brody, J. A. Asars and G. D. Dixon at Westinghouse Research Laboratories demonstrated the first thin-film-transistor liquid-crystal display. Brody and Fang-Chen Luo demonstrated the first flat active-matrix liquid-crystal display (AM LCD) using TFTs in 1974.

By 1982, pocket LCD TVs based on LCD technology were developed in Japan. The 2.1-inch Epson ET-10 Epson Elf was the first color LCD pocket TV, released in 1984. In 1988, a Sharp research team led by engineer T. Nagayasu demonstrated a 14-inch full-color LCD, which convinced the electronics industry that LCD would eventually replace CRTs as the standard television display technology. As of 2013, all modern high-resolution and high-quality electronic visual display devices use TFT-based active-matrix displays.

=== LED displays ===
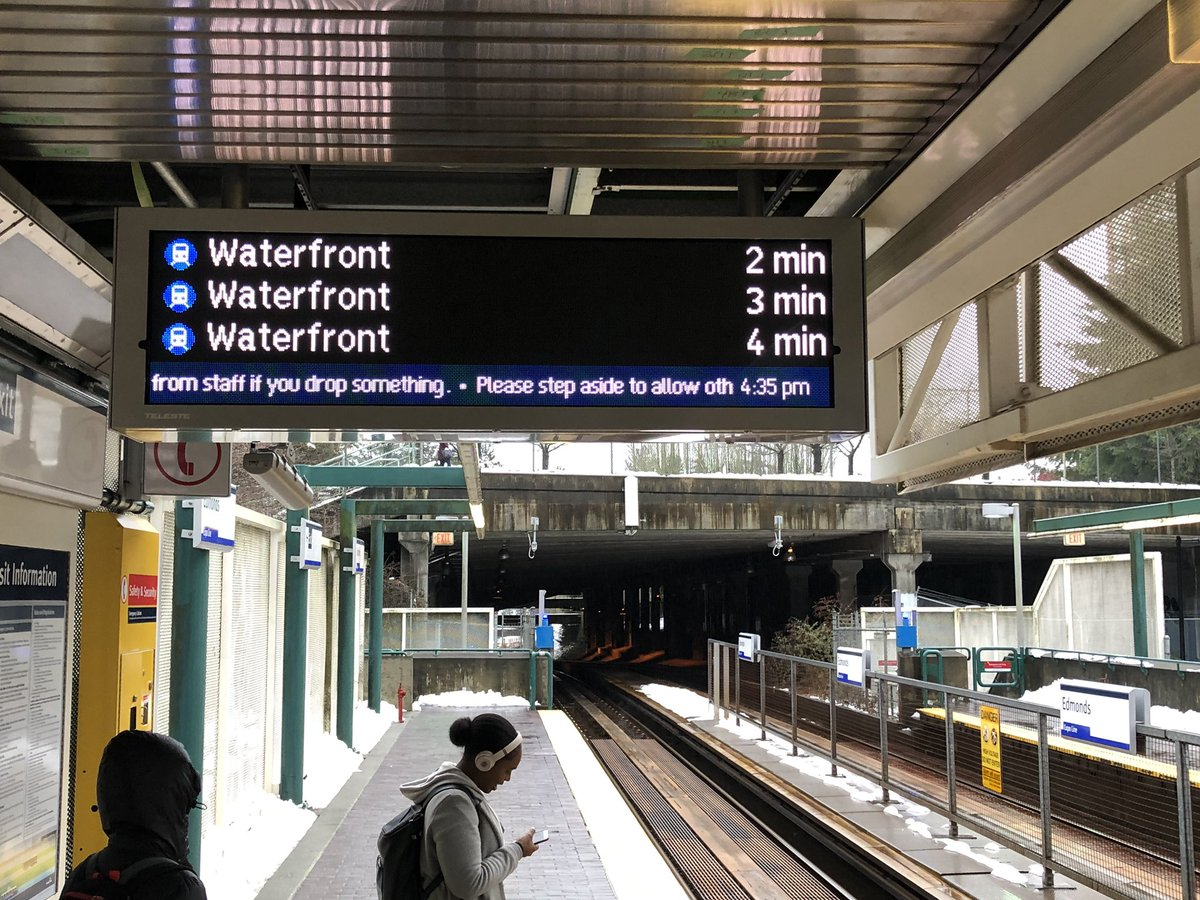
An LED screen used as an information display for travellers

The first usable LED display was developed by Hewlett-Packard (HP) and introduced in 1968. It was the result of research and development (R&D) on practical LED technology between 1962 and 1968, by a research team under Howard C. Borden, Gerald P. Pighini, and Mohamed M. Atalla, at HP Associates and HP Labs. In February 1969, they introduced the HP Model 5082-7000 Numeric Indicator. It was the first alphanumeric LED display, and was a revolution in digital display technology, replacing the Nixie tube for numeric displays and becoming the basis for later LED displays. In 1977, James P Mitchell prototyped and later demonstrated what was perhaps the earliest monochromatic flat-panel LED television display.

Ching W. Tang and Steven Van Slyke at Eastman Kodak built the first practical organic LED (OLED) device in 1987. In 2003, Hynix produced an organic EL driver capable of lighting in 4,096 colors. In 2004, the Sony Qualia 005 was the first LED-backlit LCD. The Sony XEL-1, released in 2007, was the first OLED television.

== Common types ==
=== Liquid-crystal display (LCD) ===
Field-effect LCDs are lightweight, compact, portable, cheap, more reliable, and easier on the eyes than CRT screens. LCD screens use a thin layer of liquid crystal, a liquid that exhibits crystalline properties. It is sandwiched between two glass plates carrying transparent electrodes. Two polarizing films are placed at each side of the LCD. By generating a controlled electric field between electrodes, various segments or pixels of the liquid crystal can be activated, causing changes in their polarizing properties. These polarizing properties depend on the alignment of the liquid-crystal layer and the specific field-effect used, being either twisted nematic (TN), in-plane switching (IPS) or vertical alignment (VA). Color is produced by applying appropriate color filters (red, green and blue) to the individual subpixels. LC displays are used in various electronics like watches, calculators, mobile phones, TVs, computer monitors and laptops screens etc.

=== LED-LCD ===
Most earlier large LCD screens were back-lit using a number of CCFL (cold-cathode fluorescent lamps). However, small pocket size devices almost always used LEDs as their illumination source. With the improvement of LEDs, almost all new displays are now equipped with LED backlight technology. The image is still generated by the LCD layer.

=== Plasma panel ===
A plasma display consists of two glass plates separated by a thin gap filled with a gas such as neon. Each of these plates has several parallel electrodes running across it. The electrodes on the two plates are at right angles to each other. A voltage applied between the two electrodes one on each plate causes a small segment of gas at the two electrodes to glow. The glow of gas segments is maintained by a lower voltage that is continuously applied to all electrodes. By 2010, consumer plasma displays had been discontinued by numerous manufacturers.

=== Electroluminescent panel ===
In an electroluminescent display, the image is created by applying electrical signals to the plates which make the phosphor glow.

=== Organic light-emitting diode ===
An OLED (organic light-emitting diode) is a light-emitting diode (LED) in which the emissive electroluminescent layer is a film of organic compound which emits light in response to an electric current. This layer of organic semiconductor is situated between two electrodes; typically, at least one of these electrodes is transparent. OLEDs are used to create digital displays in devices such as television screens, computer monitors, portable systems such as mobile phones, handheld game consoles and PDAs.

=== Quantum-dot light-emitting diode ===
QLED or quantum dot LED is a flat panel display technology introduced by Samsung under this trademark. Other television set manufacturers such as Sony have used the same technology to enhance the backlighting of LCD TVs already in 2013. Quantum dots create their own unique light when illuminated by a light source of shorter wavelength such as blue LEDs. This type of LED TV enhances the colour gamut of LCD panels, where the image is still generated by the LCD. In the view of Samsung, quantum dot displays for large-screen TVs are expected to become more popular than the OLED displays in the coming years; firms like Nanoco and Nanosys compete to provide the QD materials. In the meantime, Samsung Galaxy devices such as smartphones are still equipped with OLED displays manufactured by Samsung as well. Samsung explains on their website that the QLED TV they produce can determine what part of the display needs more or less contrast. Samsung also announced a partnership with Microsoft that will promote the new Samsung QLED TV.

== Volatile ==
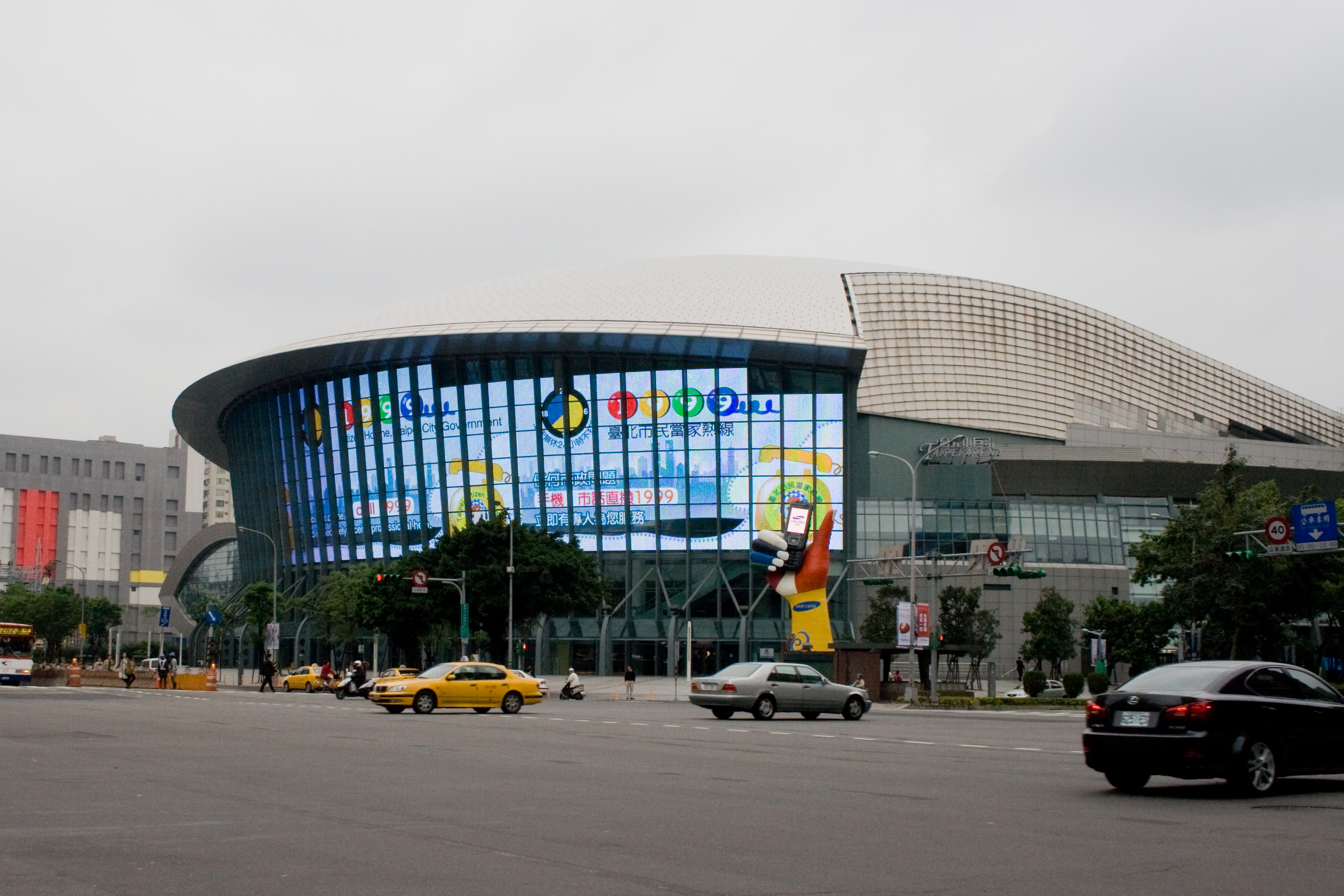
A large LED display at the Taipei Arena displays commercials and movie trailers.

Volatile displays require that pixels be periodically refreshed to retain their state, even for a static image. As such, a volatile screen needs electrical power, either from mains electricity (being plugged into a wall socket) or a battery to maintain an image on the display or change the image. This refresh typically occurs many times a second. If this is not done, for example, if there is a power outage, the pixels will gradually lose their coherent state, and the image will "fade" from the screen.

=== Examples ===
The following flat-display technologies have been commercialized in 1990s to 2010s:

- Plasma display panel (PDP)
- Active-matrix liquid-crystal display (AMLCD)
- Rear projection: Digital Light Processing (DLP), LCD, LCOS
- Electronic paper: E Ink, Gyricon
- Light-emitting diode display (LED)
- Active-matrix organic light-emitting diode (AMOLED)
- Quantum dot display (QLED)

Technologies that were extensively researched, but their commercialization was limited or has been ultimately abandoned:

- Active-matrix electroluminescent display
- Interferometric modulator display
- Field-emission display
- Surface-conduction electron-emitter display

== Static ==
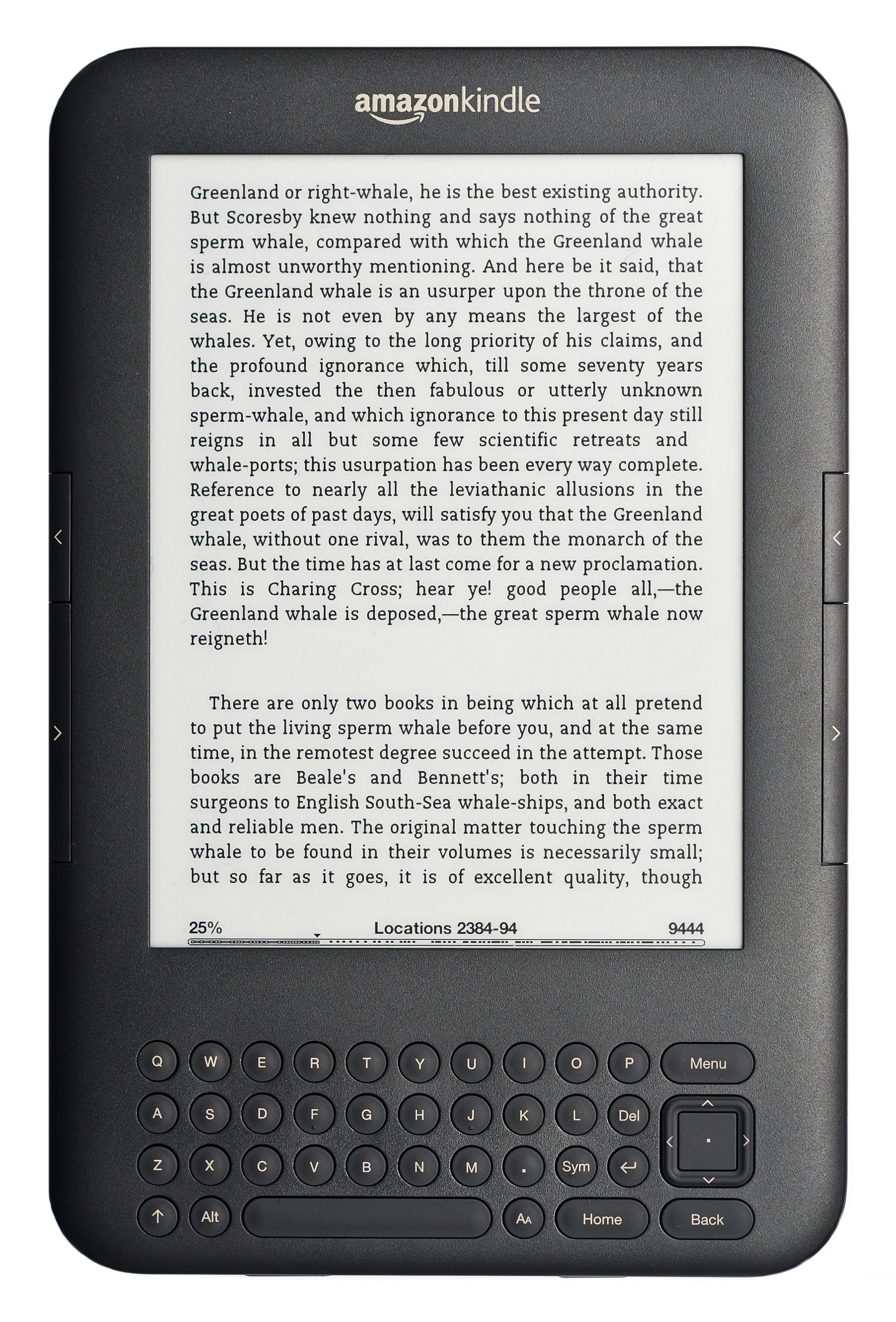
Amazon's Kindle Keyboard e-reader displaying a page of an e-book. The Kindle's image of the book's text will remain onscreen even if the battery runs out, as it is a static screen technology. Without power, however, the user cannot change to a new page.

Static flat-panel displays rely on materials whose color states are bistable. This means that the image they hold requires no energy to maintain, but instead requires energy to change. This results in a much more energy-efficient display, but with a tendency toward slow refresh rates which are undesirable in an interactive display. Bistable flat-panel displays are beginning deployment in limited applications (cholesteric liquid-crystal displays, manufactured by Magink, in outdoor advertising; electrophoretic displays in e-book reader devices from Sony and iRex; anlabels; interferometric modulator displays in a smartwatch).

== See also ==
- Computer monitor
- Display motion blur
- Electronic paper
- FPD-Link
- Flexible display
- Large-screen television technology
- LCD
- LED-backlit LCD television
- List of flat panel display manufacturers
- MicroLED
- Mobile display
- OLED
- Plasma display panel
- Quantum dot display
- Sony Watchman
- Stereoscopy 3D displays requiring no special glasses
- Touch panel
- Transparent display
