= TV80 =

Pocket television

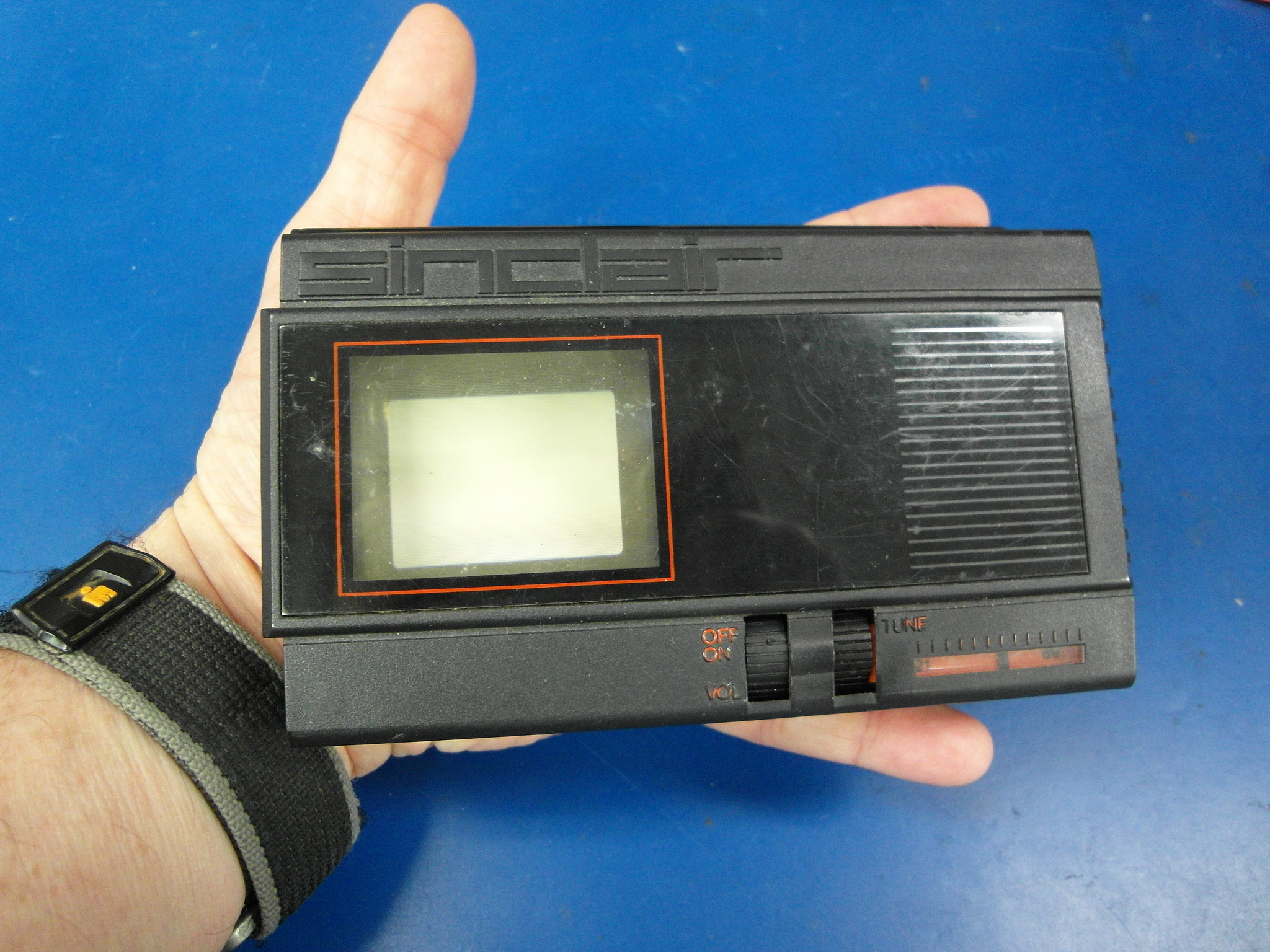
The Sinclair FTV1/TV80 flat screen TV

The Sinclair TV80, also known as the Flat Screen Pocket TV or FTV1, was a pocket television released by Sinclair Research in September 1983. Unlike Sinclair's earlier attempts at a portable television, the TV80 used a flat CRT with a side-mounted electron gun instead of a conventional CRT; the picture was made to appear larger than it was by the use of a Fresnel lens. It was a commercial failure, and did not recoup the £4 million it cost to develop; only 15,000 units were sold. New Scientist warned that the technology used by the device would be short-lived, in view of the liquid crystal display technology being developed by Casio.

== Cathode-ray tube ==
The FTV1 was unique as a consumer product in its use of a flat CRT whose beam was deflected a full 90 degrees, differing from those of a more conventional deflection used by Sony in their 1982 Watchman and other early handheld televisions. This design descended from those invented by Dennis Gabor and William Aiken in 1958, and besides the VCC 2C48 "thintube" briefly available to the scientific sector in the 1960s, was the only commercial application of such technology.

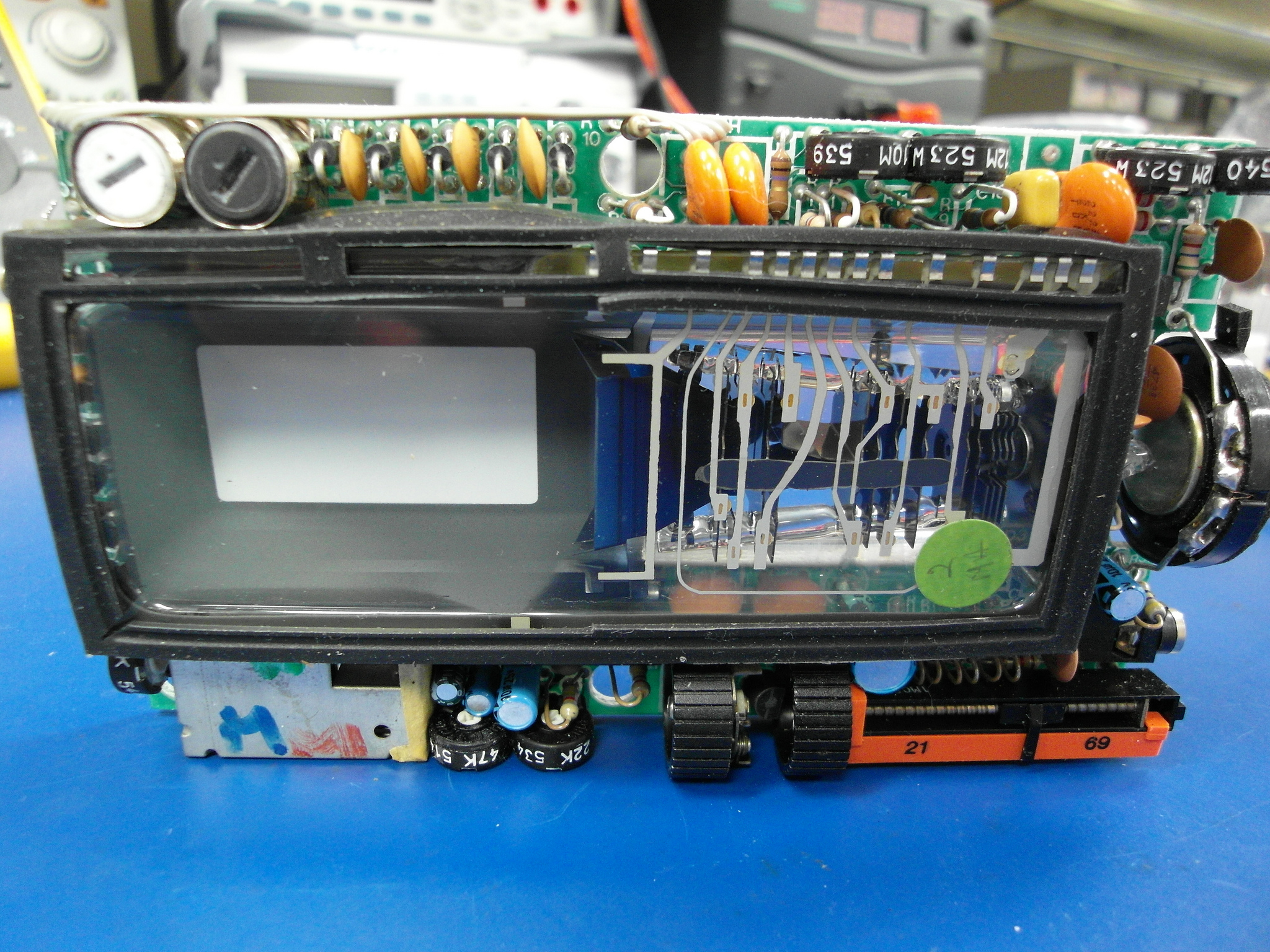
Front side of the PCB showing the flat CRT assembly

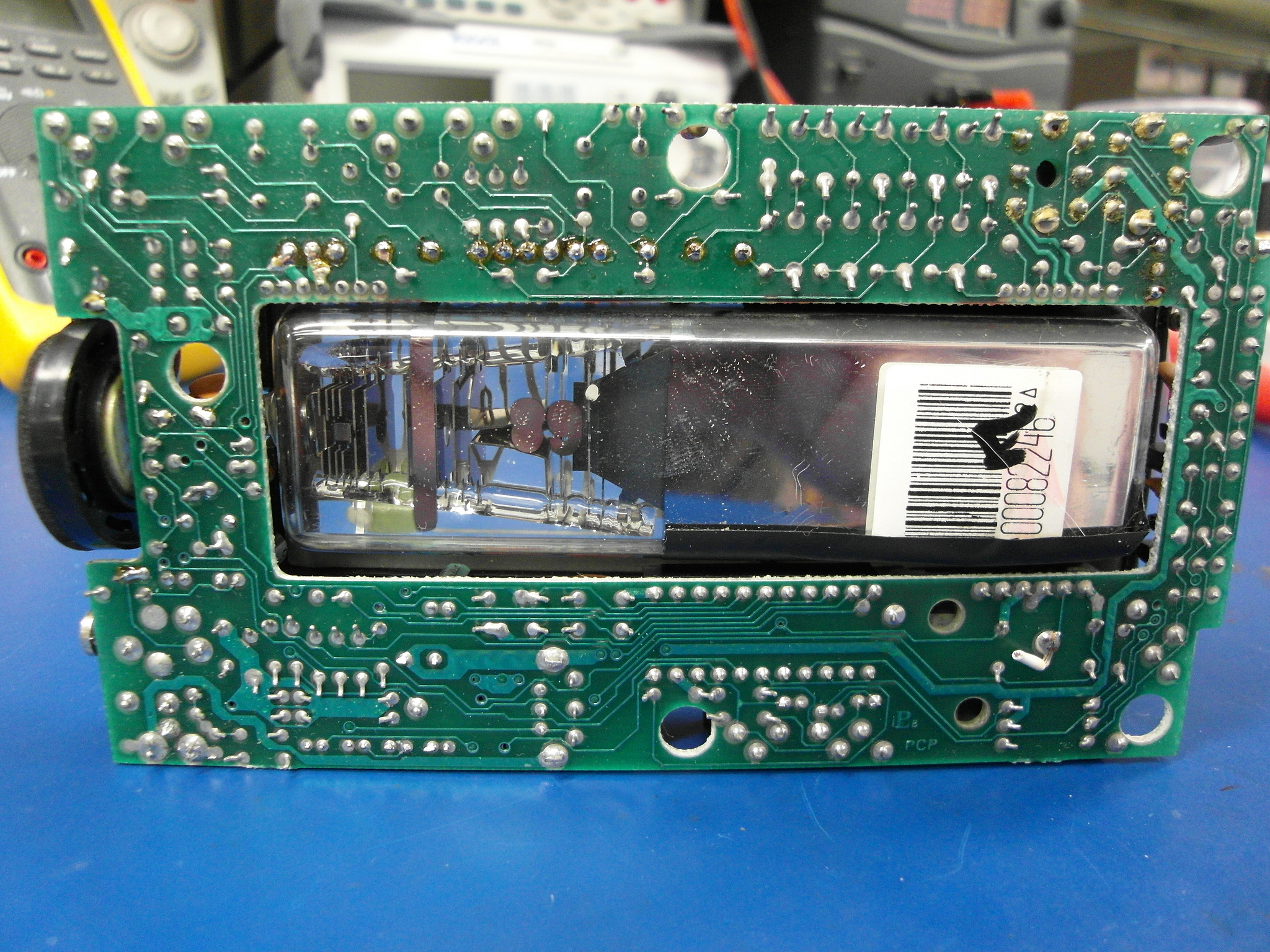
Back side of the PCB showing the bottom of the CRT assembly

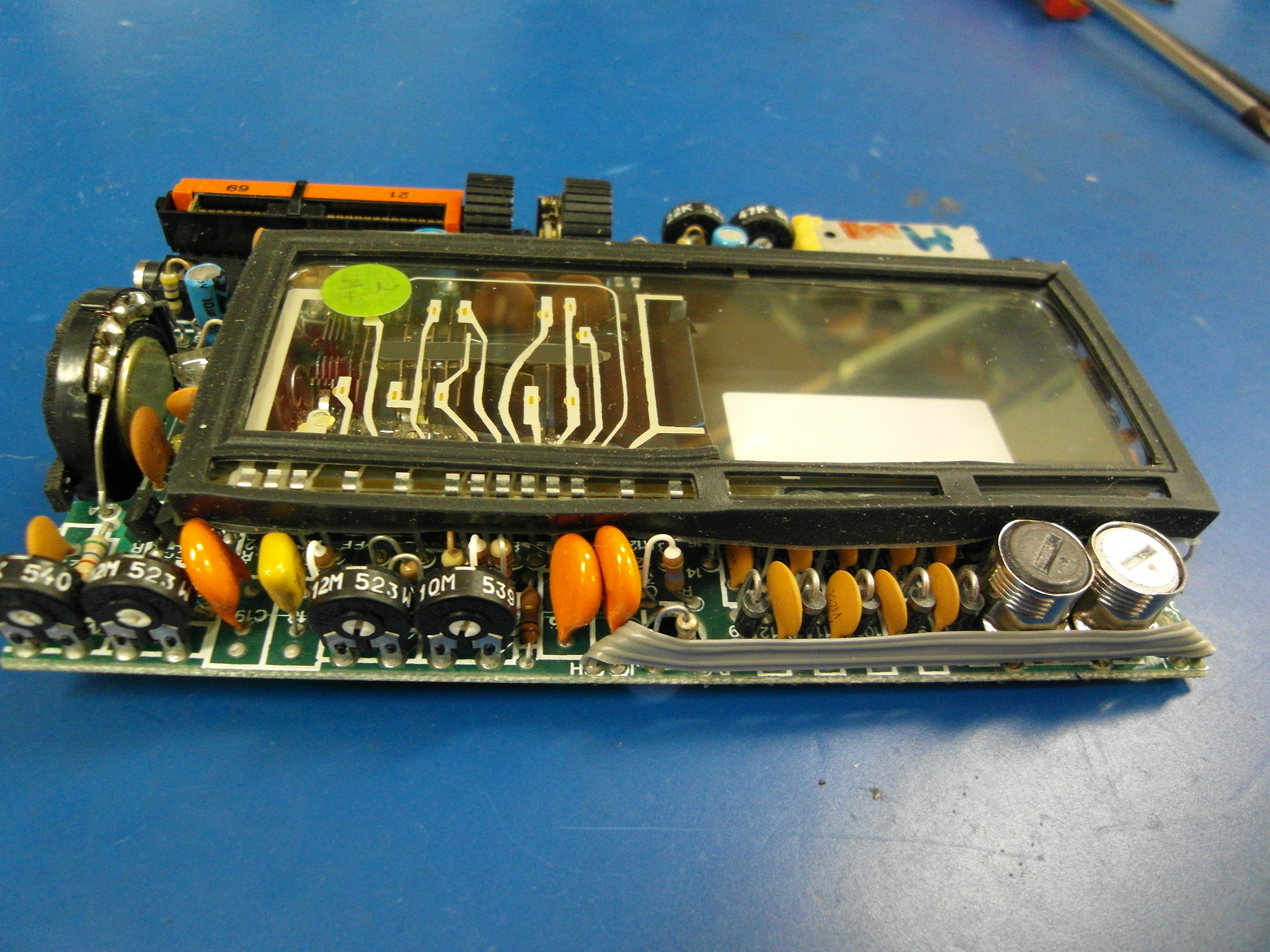
Front side of the PCB

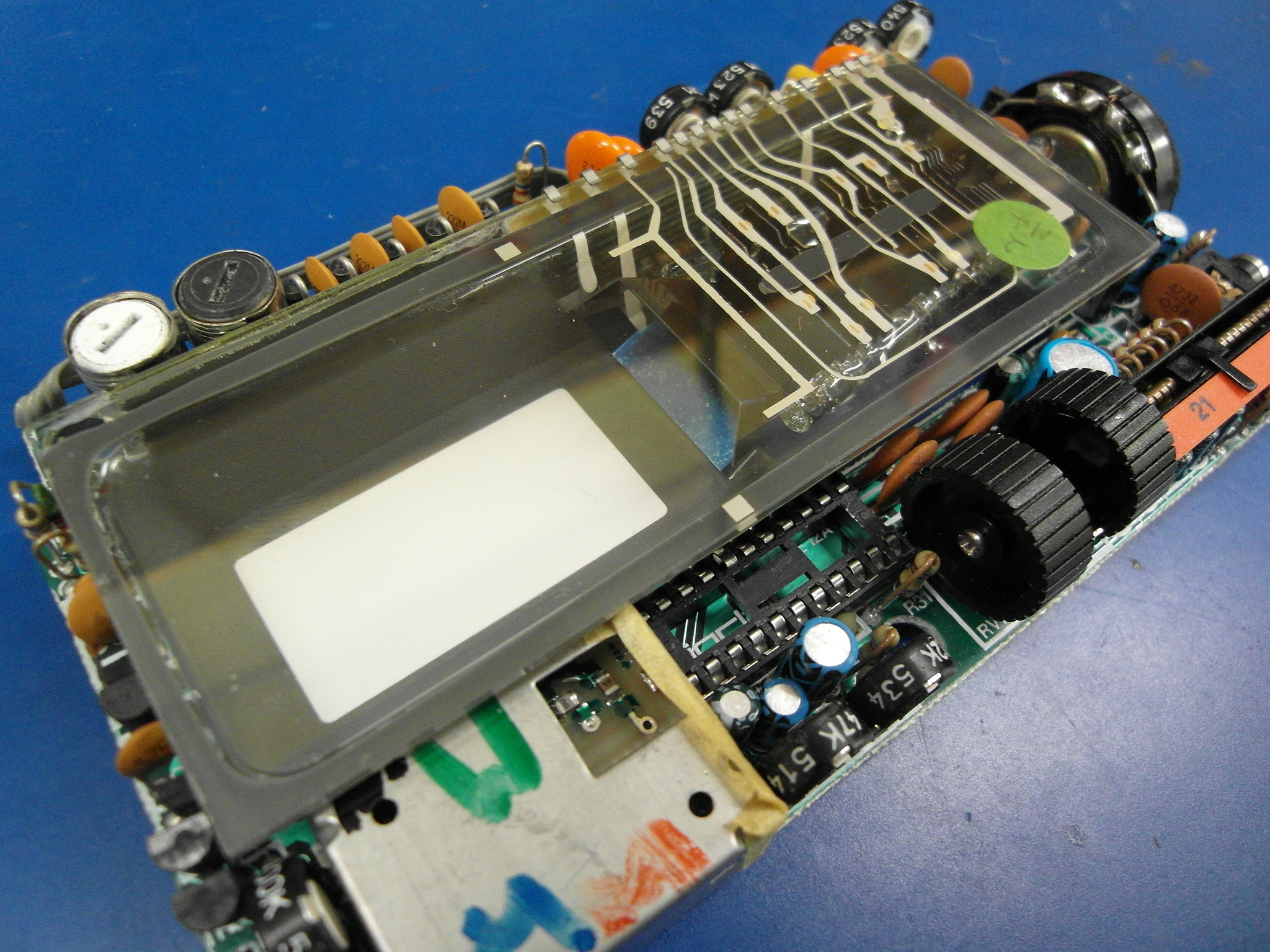
Front side of the PCB
