= Cambridge Z88 =

Notebook computer released in 1987

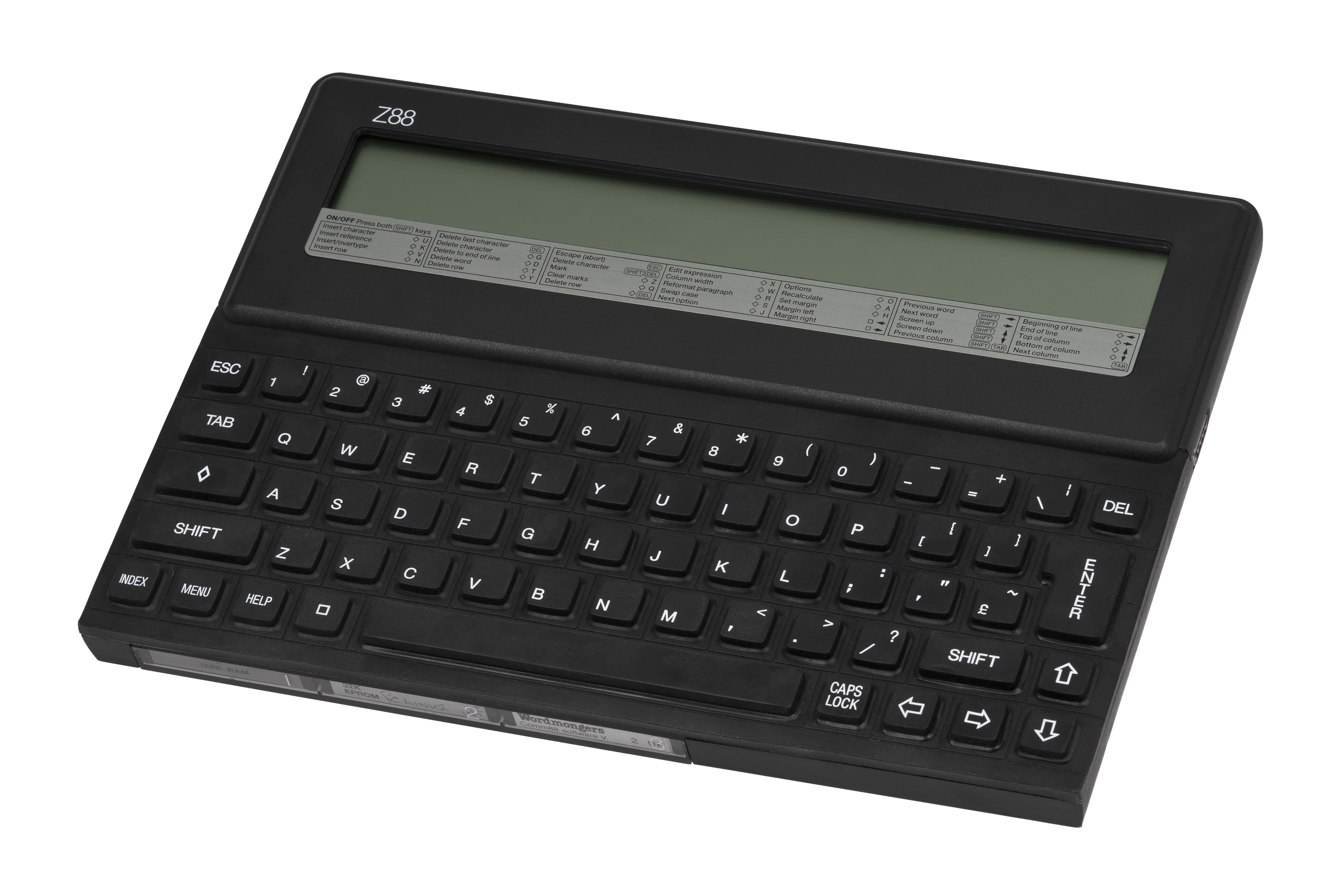
- The Cambridge Computer Z88
- Type: Notebook
- Released: September 1987; 38 years ago
- Operating system: OZ
- CPU: CMOS Z80A @ 3.2768 MHz
- Memory: 32 kB RAM, 128 kB EPROM or ROM (internal memory) as standard
- Removable storage: Proprietary RAM, EPROM or flash cards
- Display: 640 x 64 integrated LCD

The Cambridge Z88 is a Z80-based notebook computer released in 1987 by Cambridge Computer, the company formed for this purpose by Clive Sinclair. It was approximately A4 paper sized and lightweight at 0.9 kg (2.0 lb), running on four AA batteries for 20 hours of use.

It was packaged with a built-in combined word processing/spreadsheet/database application called PipeDream (functionally equivalent to a 1987 BBC Micro ROM called Acornsoft View Professional), along with several other applications and utilities, such as a Z80-version of the BBC BASIC programming language.

== History ==
The Z88 evolved from Sir Clive Sinclair's Pandora portable computer project which had been under development at Sinclair Research during the mid-1980s. Following the sale of Sinclair Research to Amstrad, Sinclair released the Z88 through his Cambridge Computer mail-order company, as he was no longer permitted to use the Sinclair name after the sale. The machine was launched at the Which Computer? Show on 17 February 1987. Early models were contract-manufactured by Thorn EMI but production later switched to SCI Systems in Irvine, Scotland.

== Design ==
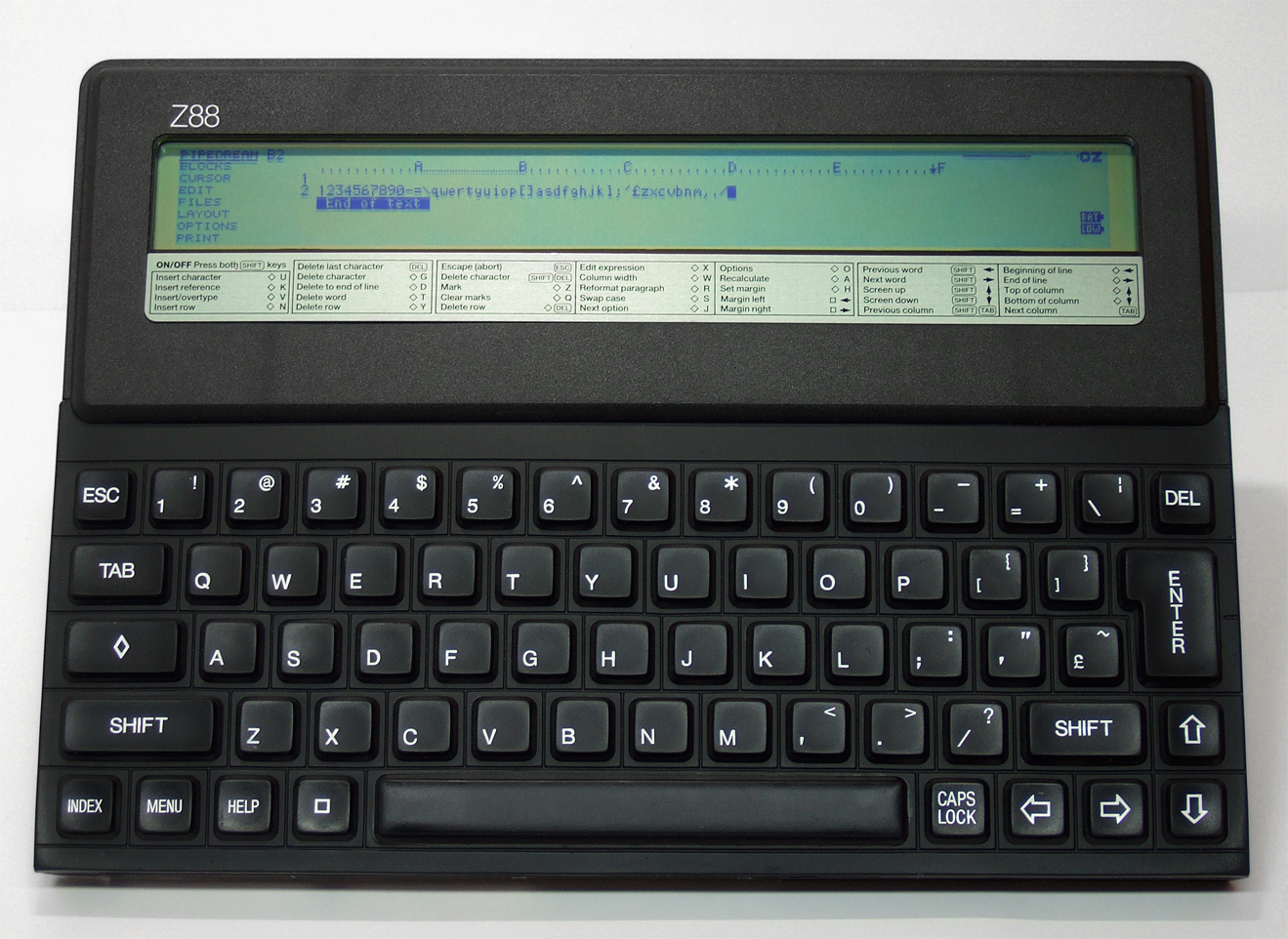
The 8-line LCD used by the Z88

The Z88 is a notebook computer weighing 0.9 kg (2.0 lb), based on a low-power CMOS version of the popular Zilog Z80 microprocessor. It comes with 32 kB of internal pseudo-static RAM and 128 kB of ROM containing the operating system (called OZ). The memory can be expanded up to 3.5 MB of RAM, the contents of which are preserved across sessions. An integrated capacitor prevents the Z88 from losing its data for the limited time it takes to change the batteries.

The machine uses a membrane keyboard, which is almost silent in use; an optional electronic "click" can be turned on to indicate keystrokes. The Z88 is powered by four AA batteries, giving up to 20 hours of use. It has three memory card slots, which accommodate proprietary RAM, EPROM or flash cards, the third slot being equipped with a built-in EPROM programmer. Card capacities range from 32 kB to 1 MB.

The Z88 has a built-in eight-line, 64 × 640 pixel super-twisted nematic display which has greater contrast than conventional twisted nematic LCDs.

The 64 kB addressable by the Z80 processor are divided in four banks of 16 kB each. The maximum memory of 4 MiB for the system is also divided in 256 segments of 16 kB each. The hardware can map any of the 16 kB blocks to any of the four banks. The first 512 kB are reserved for ROM; the next 512 kB are reserved for internal RAM. The next 3 MB are assigned to each one of the three memory slots.

== Postmarket upgrades ==
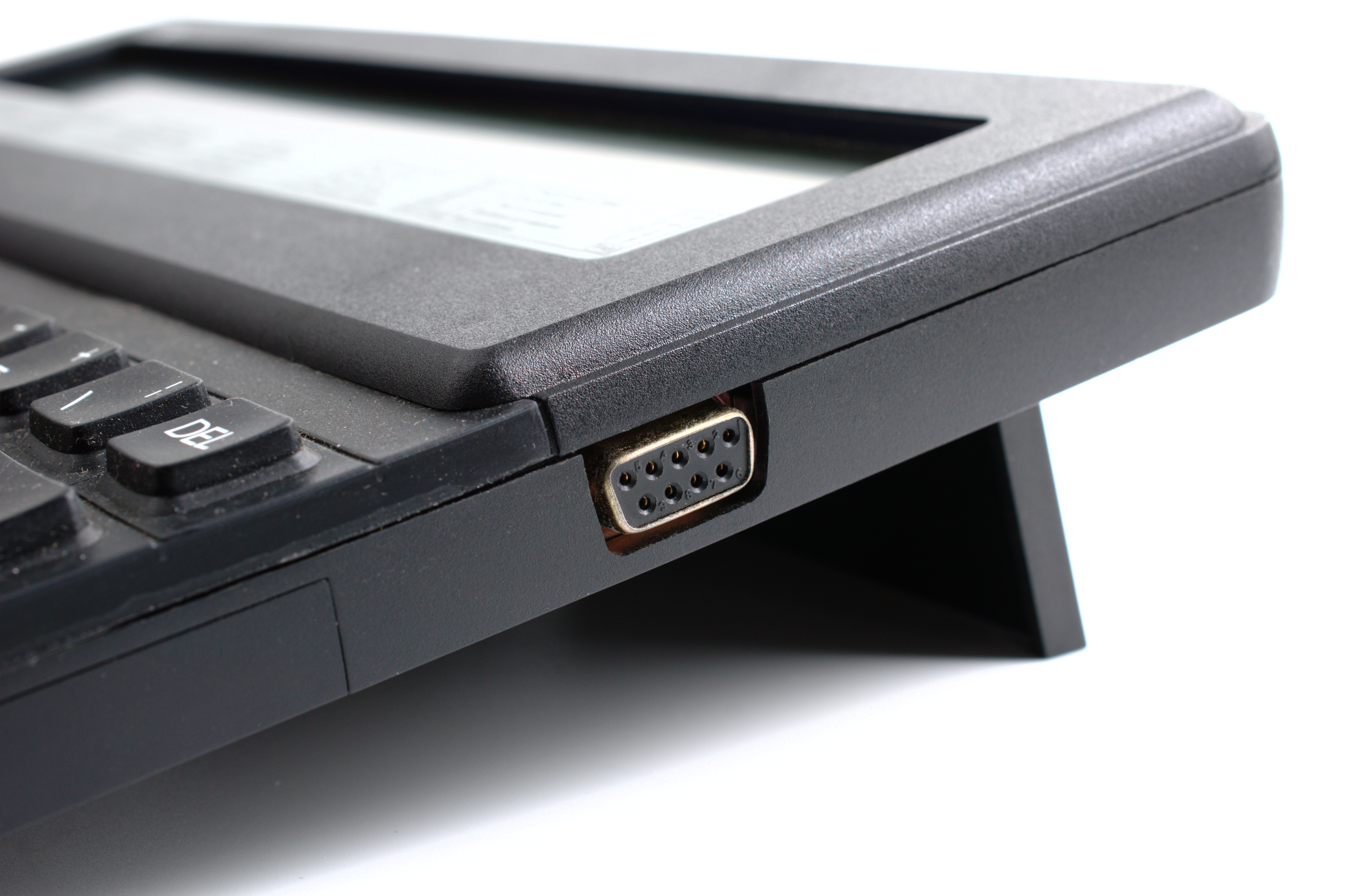
The stand and port of the Cambridge Z88

Since 1998, a 1 MiB flash memory card has been available which provides convenient non-volatile storage. Once written to the card, files are safe and not reliant on a power supply. Unlike traditional EPROM cards (erased with an external ultraviolet light), this one can be electrically erased in the computer's slot. The first generation of card only worked in slot 3 where a 12 V signal (Vpp) is available. The later generation is based on AMD chips and runs with 5 V for erasure. It is possible to read, write and erase flash cards in the three slots and the internal one.

It is also possible for an experienced user to replace the built-in 32 kB RAM chip with a bigger 128 or 512 kB static RAM chip. However, the latter requires some extra board modifications, and 512 kB is the biggest size that can be addressed by the Z88 for the internal RAM. A similar modification is possible for the internal ROM slot. A 512 kB flash chip can replace the original ROM, allowing an upgrade of the operating system.

== Reception ==
Jerry Pournelle in February 1989 described the Z88 as "the most portable computer I've ever seen", much more so than his Zenith SupersPort 286. He said that the screen was small but readable, and thought that his $894 estimate for a minimum configuration was "not a lot of money for good hardware". Pournelle said that Pipedream was "disappointingly hard to use", reported that all of his notes in the software from COMDEX had vanished because he did not explicitly save them to memory card, and suggested that the Z88 was best suited as a second computer for students and reporters.
