= Francis G. Rayer =

British writer

Francis George Rayer T.Eng.(CEI). Assoc.IERE (6 June 1921 – 11 July 1981) was a British science fiction writer and technical journalist.

He was born at Longdon, Worcestershire, England, on 6 June 1921. He was the second son of Harry Rayer, a farmer, and Florence Shepherd. Rayer began his science writing after suffering a heart attack at a young age.

During the Second World War he and his brother were exempt as farm operators. He had a bout of rheumatic fever and later joined the Home Guard.

He admired the writing of Olaf Stapledon, author of influential works of science fiction and was happy to receive positive comment from Stapledon on his novel Tomorrow Sometimes Comes.

As a fiction writer, he might be best known for his series Magnus Mensis, which was published in New Worlds science fiction magazine from 1950 to 1961. Rayer was largely associated with the John Carnell era of New Worlds. Rayer sometimes published under the pseudonyms of Chester Delray and George Longdon. When the UK Science Fiction Book Club was formed in 1953, Rayer's book Tomorrow Sometimes Comes was the fourth book issued by the club. His output included romantic novels.

From about 1960, the science fiction 'pulp' market was declining. When Michael Moorcock became editor of New Worlds Rayer largely switched to non-fiction writing. His work was largely criticized by New Wave science fiction writers. Rayer's fiction has since mostly fallen out of popularity.

As a technical journalist, he specialized in radio and electronics and designed electronic equipment. Rayer wrote many technical articles for the British magazine Practical Wireless after a letter he wrote was published in 1939. He may have used the pennames R.F. Graham and George Longdon in this context, and Roland Worcester. He was published in Short Wave magazine. Some of his books and articles were published in other languages such as French and German. Rayer also wrote for county magazines and daily newspapers in Worcestershire, and Reader's Digest.

In the 1950s Rayer was able to buy a cottage with the proceeds from his writing, known as The Reddings, at Longdon Heath, Worcestershire which he renovated. He married teacher Tessa Elizabeth Piatt in 1957 and had two children, William and Quintin. He taught himself Esperanto and professional writing skills.

Rayer obtained an amateur radio licence (G3OGR) in July 1960 and wrote technical books and numerous articles under the name F.G. Rayer, often providing illustrations and diagrams for these. In the 1960s he became interested in DX work and gathered a large collection of amateur QSL cards.

From the mid-1970s he wrote many articles on electronic construction projects. Rayer dealt with many publishers, especially maintaining a long relationship with Bernard Babani Publishing.

He died on 11 July 1981 at Upton-upon-Severn, Worcestershire following complications of diabetes. Some of his books were published after his death.

== Partial bibliography ==
=== Technical ===
Rayer wrote more than thirty technical books, covering the topics of electronics, computing and radio.

- Modern fiction-writing technique (Bond Street 1960)
- Repair of domestic electrical appliances (Arco 1961)
- AMATEUR RADIO (Arco Publications, London 1967. Available at Archive.org)
- Transistor receivers and amplifiers (Focal 1965)
- The Pegasus Book of Radio Experiments (1968)
- A guide to outdoor building (Arthur Barker 1970)
- 50 (FET) Field Effect Transistor Projects (Babani 1977)
- How to Make Walkie Talkies (Babani 1977)
- How to Build Your Own Metal and Treasure Locators (Babani 1978)
- How to build your own solid state oscilloscope (Babani 1979)
- Audio Projects (Babani 1981)
- Projects in Amateur Radio and Short Wave Listening (Newnes 1981)
- Electronic timer projects (Babani 1981)
- Beginner's guide to amateur radio with John Earl (Newnes 1982)
- Integrated circuits for beginners (published by Babani 1982 posthumously)

=== Fiction ===
- Realm of the Alien (1946, as Chester Delray)
- Lady in Danger (Grafton 1948)
- Worlds at War [editor] (Tempest Publications, 1949)
- Deus ex Machina (Nova 1950)
- Tomorrow Sometimes Comes (van Thal 1951)
- Cardinal of the Stars
- Coming of the Darakua (1952) novel
- Earth Our New Eden (Hamilton/Authentic 1952)
- We Cast No Shadow (1952) novel
- The Star Seekers (1953) Tit-Bits SF Library collection
- Jock MacTavish series (1952 - 1954)
- Sands Our Abode (New Worlds 1959)
- Alien (New Worlds 1959)
- Adjustment Period (1960)
- Capsid (1962)
- Aqueduct (1963)
- Cardinal of the Stars (Digit 1964), in the USA Journey to the Stars
- The Iron and the Anger (Digit 1964) novel

Rayer wrote many short stories for SF magazines such as New Worlds, Fantastic Adventures and Nebula.
