= Bernadette Tynan =

British author and TV presenter (1966–2017)

- Born: March 1966; Bury, Greater Manchester, United Kingdom
- Died: 16 August 2017 (aged 51); Saint-Astier, Dordogne, France
- Occupations: Educator; Author; Presenter

Bernadette Tynan (March 1966 – 16 August 2017) was a British author and television presenter.

== Career ==
Tynan was born in Bury in 1966 to parents of Irish descent. She did a BA and masters in London, graduated from Cambridge university with a master's degree in education, and was a senior lecturer at the Research Centre for Able Children at the Westminster Institute, Oxford Brookes university.

Tynan's book Your Child Can Think Like A Genius was published in 2004, and reached 2nd on the Singapore Straits Times bestseller list in the non-fiction category. The book advocated less formal forms of education, and deprecated the use of academic qualifications and numerical measures to quantify intelligence.

In 2008 Tynan presented the television series Make Your Child Brilliant, where selected children underwent her training techniques which focused on hands-on learning. The series aired in the UK, Australia, New Zealand, and Canada. The series was accompanied by the launch of book written by Tynan of the same name.

Tynan was a critic of what she saw as the UK's "exam-crazed culture", and believed that computer gaming could potentially harm the parent-child bond. Critics characterised her methods as "conjur[ing] up concerns about hot-housing" and of being selective.

== Personal life ==
At the age of 22 Tynan was briefly engaged to be married to the computer entrepreneur and inventor Clive Sinclair, then 48, whom she had met at a Mensa meeting in Blackpool. Tynan broke off the engagement.

Tynan died in 2017 from endometrial cancer.

== Books ==
Tynan was the author of books including:

- Your Child Can Think Like A Genius (Thorsons, 2004)
- Make Your Child Brilliant (Hardie Grant Books, 2008)
