= Aiken tube =

First successful flat panel black and white television

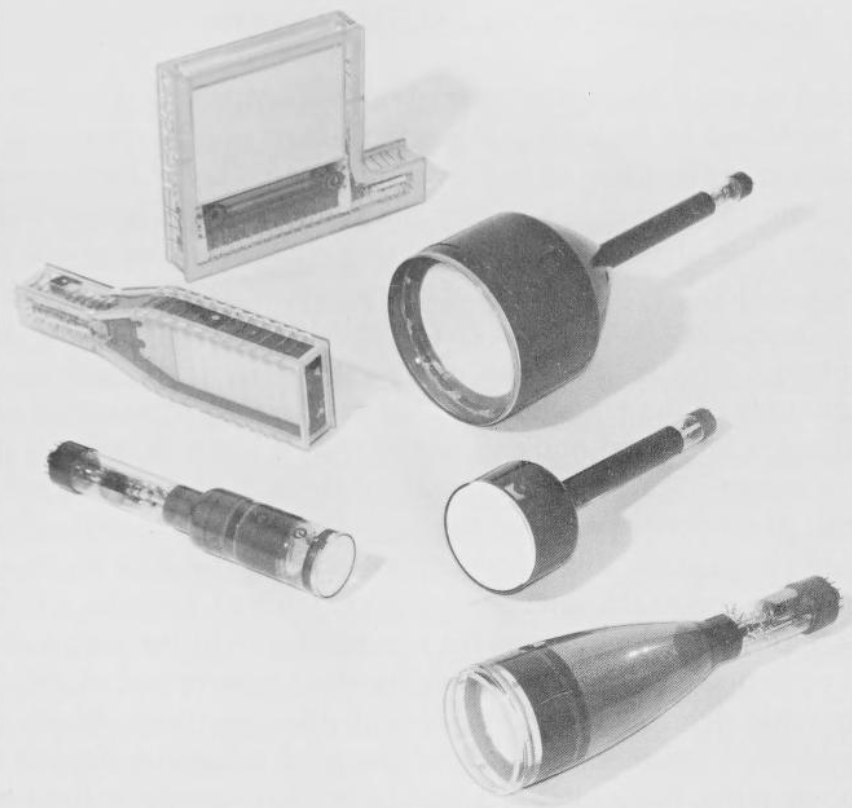
Video Color Corp.'s 1968 product catalogue, including two types of "thintube" flat CRTs.

The Aiken tube was the first successful flat panel black-and-white television. A variant designed for oscilloscopes and similar laboratory equipment was commercially released in early 1965 as the Video Color Corp. 2C48 "Thintube." Originally designed in the early 1950s, a small number of tubes were built in 1958 for military use in a collaboration with Kaiser Industries. An extended patent battle followed with a similar technology developed in the United Kingdom, and planned commercial production for the home market never started. Further development was carried out by a number of companies, including Sinclair Electronics and RCA, after the patents had expired. The displays were only produced in small quantities for military applications and oscilloscopes.

== History ==
=== Genesis ===
William Ross Aiken was an electrical engineering undergraduate student at UC Berkeley in 1941. Originally expecting to graduate in the Class of 1942, he decided to take a year off and work in industry. He got a job at the Kaiser Shipyards plant number 2 in Richmond, California, and was promoted to head of the electrical department. When the US entered World War II, Aiken's selective service status was declared as category 1-B. He was one of seven people in the country "frozen" in their jobs by Admiral Land and unable to leave their job under any circumstances.

When the war ended Aiken was drafted, but declared 4-F due to asthma, and was instead sent to work in industry in a variety of jobs. He spent the next six years working for the University of California Radiation Laboratory, today's Lawrence Livermore National Laboratory, designing controls for the cyclotrons being built there. He was then put in charge of developing an x-ray spectrometer for measuring the temperature of the fireballs from nuclear weapons. While working on these developments he was sent to Eniwetok during a series of nuclear tests.

It was during this time that he came up with the idea for a new type of thin cathode ray tube (CRT) while he was working with oscilloscopes. He thought the display tubes in use at the time were too long, and a shorter tube would be much more practical. Aiken was not the first to consider the possibility of a compact CRT with a thin display screen, but no-one had been successful in developing one at that point. There were any number of problems, especially with focusing arrangements, but Aiken kept attacking them one by one until he developed what he felt was a workable solution.

Having sketched out the idea, he went to the U.S. Atomic Energy Commission, his employer at the time, but they didn't find the concept interesting. Returning from Eniwetok he next approached the Radiation Laboratory, but they too declined to take up development. He decided to build a thin CRT prototype on his own. He rented space in the basement of a post office, and developed a working tube that could draw and move a dot around the screen.

=== Kaiser enters ===
It was one thing to draw a dot on the screen and move it around, it is another entirely to make a working television. Looking for development capital, Aiken started shopping the concept around to anyone who expressed an interest. Warner Brothers sent an engineer to examine it, but declined to fund development believing it was being faked. Walter Baker, the head of General Electric's research labs, called Aiken to set up a meeting, but Aiken demanded they sign a non-disclosure agreement and Baker refused.

Aiken then approached some of his old contacts at Kaiser, and they proved much more interested and happy to sign the non-disclosure agreement. After seeing the unit and how it worked they decided to fund development using profits from another division. When they discovered that the profits were due to an accounting error, development almost ended.

By this time the United States Naval Research Laboratory had heard about his work and were very interested in developing it as an interactive plotting table for displaying the data from sonobuoys in anti-submarine helicopters. They later added an additional role as a heads up display for the T-2 Buckeye trainer, which required a transparent phosphor so the pilot could look through the display and out of the canopy. With their funding secure, Kaiser set up a new laboratory in Palo Alto, California. Shockley Semiconductor collaborated on the development of a small transistorized computer to display basic navigation information, while Corning was brought in to develop the super-flat glass plates needed to front the display.

While development continued, Kaiser started looking for partners in the consumer electronics space that might be able to help fund the effort of taking the tube into commercial production. At the time, the NTSC was in the process of introducing its color television standard and enormous amounts of funding were being spent on developing a wide array of technologies in the color market. Kaiser was unable to find anyone interested in developing another black and white system, and after the government contracts ran out, stopped funding development.

=== Lawsuit ===
It was about this time that the similar tube developed by Dennis Gabor (better known as the developer of holograms) first came to their attention. Gabor's design was similar in that it used an offset gun and deflection plates behind the phosphor, but differed in having the electron gun arranged under the display area rather than to the side. Aiken had also filed similar patents after his early attempts. A patent battle followed, with Gabor eventually winning UK rights and Aiken U.S. rights. By this point active development of both had ended, and the two became friends.

Aiken went on to develop a number of unrelated display technologies, similar to the flip-disc display eventually forming "Display Technology Corporation" to produce them.

== Commercial release ==
In the early 1960s, with the patent debate settled, William Aiken formed Video Color Corporation (VCC), which produced standard-deflection color CRTs, as well as limited amounts of the Geer-Aiken "thintube." The January 1964 issue of Electronics World, whose cover depicted such a tube, announced that "The Video Color Corporation of Inglewood, California is starting production of the Thintube and will soon start producing a two-primary-color, two-gun version."

A year later, the January 1965 issue of Electronics and March 1965 of Electronics World both featured said two-color version, termed the Model 2C48. Electronics World proclaimed that "Video Color Corporation is now marketing the 2C48 two-color, thin cathode-ray tube." Both magazines noted it was a commercially available product, and stated that "[t]he tube is available in a wide variety of sizes and shapes."

In 1966, Video Color Corp. relocated to El Segundo, California, and was purchased by Noramco, Inc. They continued advertising their "thin tubes" throughout the late 1960s, mostly in magazines pertaining to advanced display systems such as the Journal of the Society for Information Display. In 1967, VCC was purchased by Dyna Ray Corp. By 1968, they had produced a brochure which showcased their various CRTs with unusual deflection methods.

The amount of such thintubes actually produced and sold is unclear, although it seems most were used in specialized laboratory equipment, such as oscilloscopes, particularly where a compact display was needed.

They continued producing CRTs, and released at least one other model with nonstandard deflection, the VC5KP. Electro-Optical Systems, Inc., a subsidiary of Xerox, purchased an aluminized screen from VCC in 1967 as part of a research program in thermionics for NASA, and another non-standard CRT from VCC went to the U.S. DoD's Naval Air Development Center.

== Description ==
Aiken developed a number of different tube designs while working with Kaiser, a number of which were described in U.S. Patent 2,795,731.

The primary design used an electron gun arranged to the side of the screen, either firing horizontally across the top of the display tube, or firing vertically towards the top and then bent through 90 degrees to travel along the top. Across the top of the tube were a series of C-shaped plates and a matching set of parallel bars below it. The plates were charged relative to the bars to provide deflection, bending the beam to travel between the bars and down the face of the tube.

Behind the tube was a series of wide metal plates running horizontally along the back face of the display. These were used to bend the beam through an angle and cause it to hit the front face of the screen. 2D scanning was accomplished by charging two of the horizontal plates to select a vertical location on the display, and then quickly charging the deflection plates at the top in turn to select a horizontal location. Each vertical and horizontal plate addressed many locations on the screen, with the locations within each plate's area selected by charging it relative to its neighbors.

The patents describe a number of different systems for constructing the deflection plates, including both electrostatic and electromagnetic circuits. Switching the plates on and off at high frequencies and high voltages is a major problem, even today, and a number of different systems were described to accomplish this, including an optical-mechanical system similar to the Nipkow disk.

The second design, described in U.S. Patent 2,837,691, was similar to the first for vertical addressing, but used a conventional horizontal scanning system. The gun was moved to the lower middle of the display, firing upward, scanned horizontally by a single pair of deflection plates arranged just above the gun. Horizontal scanning is much faster than vertical, so this change greatly reduced the complexity of the driver electronics. At the top of the screen was a single wire charged to very high voltages, which bent the beam through 180 degrees back towards the bottom of the display. The vertical deflection plates were mounted on a plate arranged to lie between the path of the beam as it traveled upwards at the back of the tube and back down at the front.

== See also ==
- Sinclair TV80 / FTV1, a commercially available portable television using technology descended from Gabor's designs
