= Bernard Babani =

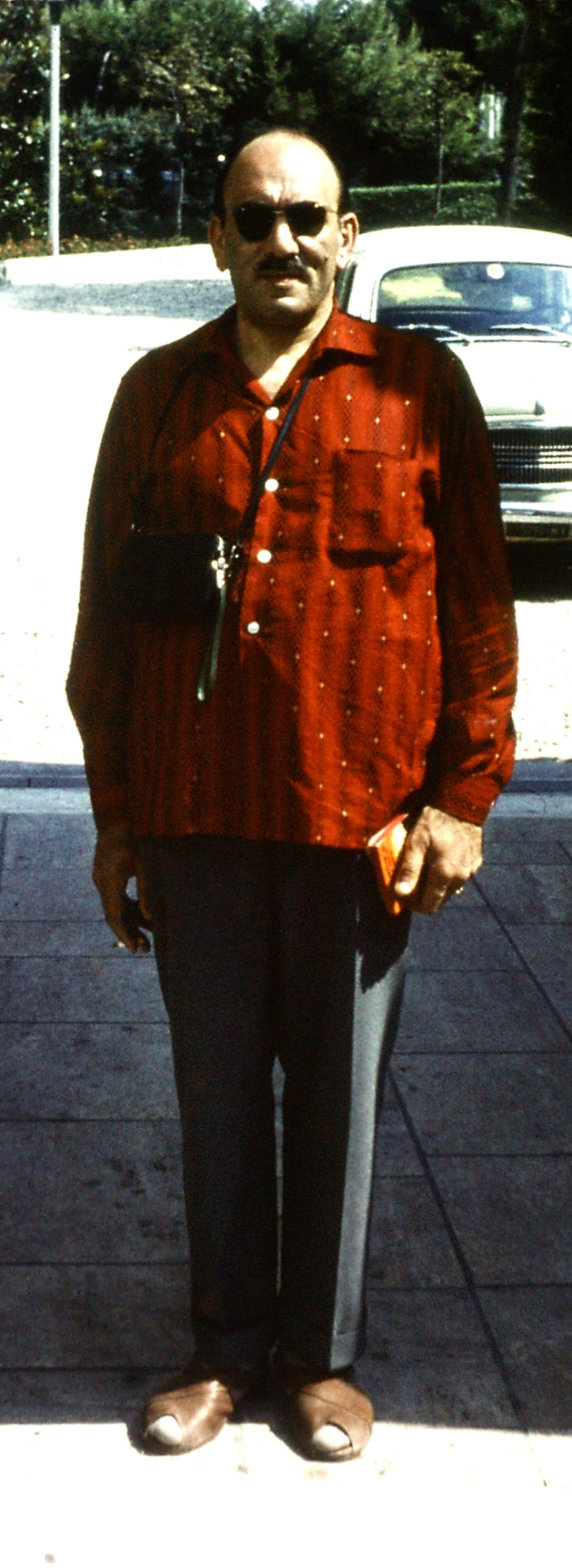
- Founded: 1942
- Founder: Bernard B. Babani
- Country of origin: United Kingdom
- Headquarters location: London
- Official website: babanibooks.com

Bernard Baruch Babani (12 May 1913 – 30 October 1975) was a UK technical book publisher. His father Haim, a dealer in Oriental carpets, was born in Constantinople (now Istanbul) and emigrated to England at the turn of the twentieth century, marrying Rebecca Levy, who likewise was a native of Constantinople. Bernard was the eldest of their four children, all born in west London.

== Publishing ==
Poor eyesight prevented Bernard from serving in the Second World War, instead becoming an inspector at D. Napier & Son. This in the Edwardian era had been a precision engineering company known for its luxury motor cars, but by the mid-twentieth century was focused on the production of aero engines.

During the War, he began publishing technical books. His first publication, Amalgated Engineering Reference Tables and Data Charts, appeared in 1942, due to a demand by other engineers for his conversion tables (at the time there were many incompatible systems of measurement in use besides feet and inches). At the end of the War he founded Bernard's (Publishers) Ltd., issuing inexpensive, practical booklets for amateur radio and electronics enthusiasts. By August 1958, his publishing company, now renamed Babani Books, had 150 titles on its list. It published many of Sir Clive Sinclair's books in the late 1950s and early 1960s. He was an agent for the technical writer F.G. Rayer.

== Personal life ==
He married Sarah Bolotnikoff in 1937. Their son Michael Babani carried on running the publishing company from The Grampians, a 1930s apartment block in Shepherd's Bush, until January 2025 when it was dissolved.

Bernard died in October 1975.
