= Clive Sinclair =

English entrepreneur and inventor (1940–2021)

Sir Clive Sinclair
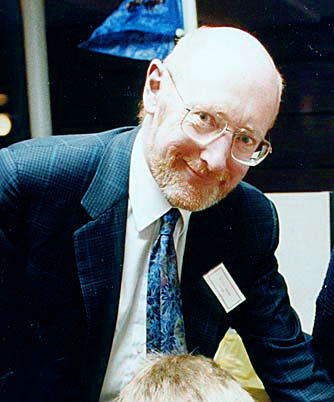
- Sinclair in 1992
- Born: Clive Marles Sinclair; 30 July 1940; Ealing, Middlesex, England
- Died: 16 September 2021 (aged 81); London, England
- Occupations: Entrepreneur; inventor
- Years active: 1961−2010
- Known for: Founder of Sinclair Radionics, Sinclair Research, Sinclair Vehicles; Inventor of the slimline pocket calculator, ZX80, ZX81, ZX Spectrum, QL
- Spouses: Ann Trevor-Briscoe (m. 1962; div. 1985) Angie Bowness (m. 2010; div. 2017)
- Children: 3
- Awards: Knight Bachelor (1983)

Sir Clive Marles Sinclair (30 July 1940 – 16 September 2021) was an English entrepreneur and inventor, best known for being a pioneer in the computing industry and also as the founder of several companies that developed consumer electronics in the 1970s and early 1980s.

After spending several years as assistant editor of Instrument Practice, Sinclair founded Sinclair Radionics Ltd in 1961. He produced the world's first slimline electronic pocket calculator (the Sinclair Executive) in 1972. Sinclair then moved into the production of home computers in 1980 with Sinclair Research Ltd, producing the Sinclair ZX80 (the UK's first mass-market home computer for less than £100) and in the early 1980s, the ZX81, ZX Spectrum and the Sinclair QL. Sinclair Research is widely recognised for its importance in the early days of the British and European home computer industry, as well as helping to give rise to the British video game industry.

Sinclair also had several commercial failures, including the Sinclair Radionics Black Watch wristwatch, the Sinclair Vehicles C5 battery electric vehicle, and the Sinclair Research TV80 flatscreen CRT handheld television set. The failure of the C5, along with a weakened computer market, forced Sinclair to sell most of his companies by 1986. Until 2010, Sinclair concentrated on personal transport, including the A-bike, a folding bicycle for commuters which was small enough to fit in a handbag. He also developed the Sinclair X-1, a revised version of the C5 electric vehicle, which never made it to the market.

Sinclair was appointed Knight Bachelor in the 1983 Birthday Honours for his contributions to the personal computer industry in the UK.

== Early life, family and education ==
Sinclair's father and grandfather were engineers; both had been apprentices at the shipbuilders Vickers. His grandfather George Sinclair was a naval architect who got the paravane, a mine sweeping device, to work. George Sinclair's son, George William "Bill" Sinclair, wanted to take religious orders or become a journalist. His father suggested he train as an engineer first; Bill became a mechanical engineer and remained in the field. At the outbreak of World War II in 1939, he was running his own machine tools business in London, and later worked for the Ministry of Supply.

Clive Sinclair was born to George Sinclair and Thora Edith Ella Marles on 30 July 1940, in Ealing, Middlesex. He and his mother left London for safety to stay with an aunt in Devon, where they eventually moved to Teignmouth. A telegram arrived shortly afterwards, bringing the news that their home in Ealing had been bombed. Sinclair's father found a house in Bracknell in Berkshire. His brother Iain was born in 1943 and his sister Fiona in 1947.

Sinclair attended Boxgrove Preparatory School, excelling in mathematics. Sinclair had little interest in sports and found himself out of place at school. By the time he was ten, his father had financial problems. He had branched out from machine tools and planned to import miniature tractors from the U.S.; he had to give up the business. Because of his father's problems, Sinclair had to move school several times. After a time at Reading School, Sinclair took his O-levels at Highgate School in London in 1955, and his A-levels and S-levels in physics, pure maths, and applied maths at St George's College, Weybridge.

During his early years, Sinclair earned money mowing lawns and washing up in a café, earning 6d (2½p) more than the permanent staff. Later he went for holiday jobs at electronic companies. At Solartron he inquired about the possibility of electrically propelled personal vehicles. Sinclair applied for a holiday job at Mullard and took one of his circuit designs; he was rejected for precociousness. While still at school he wrote his first article for Practical Wireless.

After he left school at the age of 18, he sold miniature electronic kits by mail order to the hobby market.

== Career ==
=== Sinclair Radionics ===
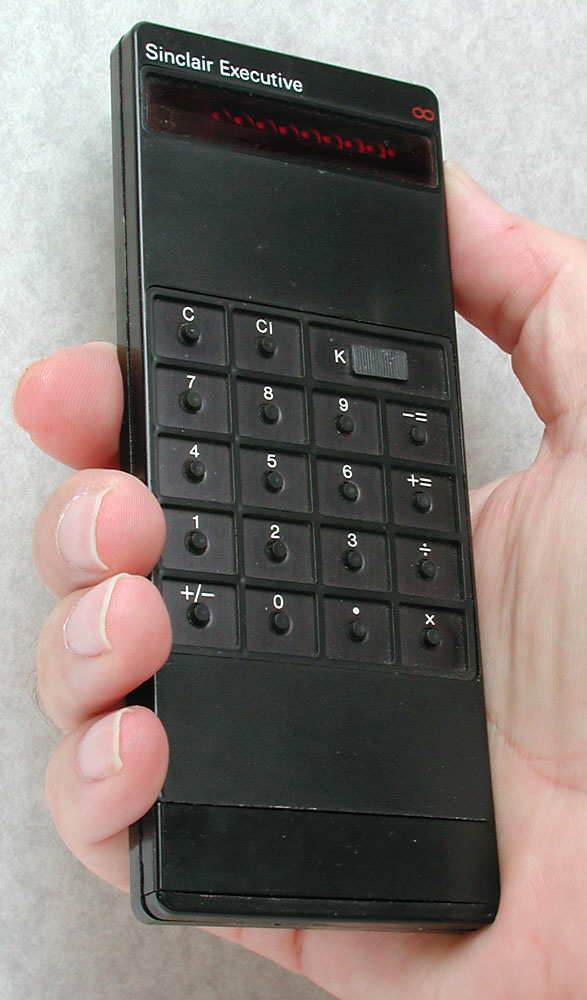
Sinclair Executive pocket calculator (launched in 1972)

Sinclair's Micro Kit was formalised in an exercise book dated 19 June 1958, three weeks before his A-levels. Sinclair drew a radio circuit, Model Mark I, with a components list: cost per set 9/11 (49½p), plus coloured wire and solder, nuts and bolts, plus celluloid chassis (drilled) for nine shillings (45p). Also in the book are the advertisement rates for Radio Constructor at the time (9d (3¾p)/word, minimum 6/- (30p)) and Practical Wireless (5/6 (27½p) per line or part line). Sinclair estimated producing 1,000 a month, placing orders with suppliers for 10,000 of each component to be delivered.

Sinclair wrote a book for Bernard's Publishing, Practical transistor receivers Book 1, which appeared in January 1959. It was re-printed late that year and nine times subsequently. His practical stereo handbook was published in June 1959 and reprinted seven times over 14 years. The last book Sinclair wrote as an employee of Bernard's was Modern Transistor Circuits for Beginners, published in May 1962. At Bernard Babani, he wrote 13 constructor books.

In 1961, Sinclair registered Sinclair Radionics Ltd. His original choice, Sinclair Electronics, had been taken; Sinclair Radio was available but did not sound right. Sinclair Radionics was formed on 25 July 1961. Sinclair made two attempts to raise startup capital to advertise his inventions and buy components. He designed PCB kits and licensed some technology. Then he took his design for a miniature transistor pocket radio and sought a backer for its production in kit form. Eventually he found someone who agreed to buy 55% of his company for £3,000, but the deal did not finalise.

Sinclair, unable to find capital, joined United Trade Press (UTP) as technical editor of Instrument Practice. Sinclair appeared in the publication as an assistant editor in March 1962. Sinclair described making silicon planar transistors, their properties and applications and hoped they might be available by the end of 1962. Sinclair undertook a survey of semiconductor devices for Instrument Practice, which appeared in four sections between September 1962 and January 1963.

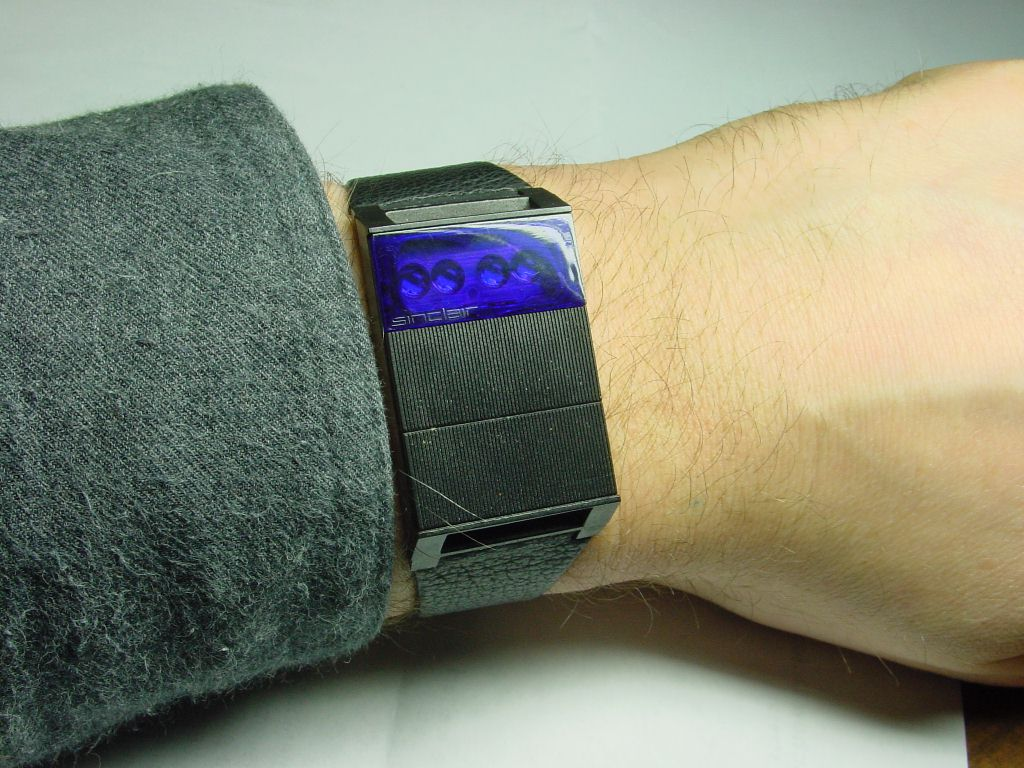
Sinclair Radionics Black Watch (launched in 1975)

His last appearance as assistant editor was in April 1969. Through UTP, Sinclair had access to thousands of devices from 36 manufacturers. He contacted Semiconductors Ltd (who at that time sold semiconductors made by Plessey) and ordered rejects to repair. He produced a design for a miniature radio powered by a couple of hearing aid cells and made a deal with Semiconductors to buy its micro-alloy transistors at 6d (2½p) each in boxes of 10,000. He then carried out his own quality control tests, and marketed his renamed MAT 100 and 120 at 7s 9d (38¾p) and 101 and 121 at 8s 6d (42½p).

By the late 1960s and early 1970s, Sinclair Radionics was producing handheld electronic calculators, miniature televisions, and the digital Black Watch wristwatch. The latter product, introduced in 1975, was a significant failure for Sinclair: in addition to being unable to meet demand, the watch itself was found to be inaccurate and difficult to service, and its battery life was too short. Sinclair Radionics suffered its first financial loss in 1975–1976, and Sinclair sought potential investors to help recover the lost funds. He eventually worked with the National Enterprise Board (NEB), which bought a 43% interest in the company in 1976, but this injection of funds was found to be too late as by this point, other companies were starting to make similar products at lower costs on the market. The NEB streamlined Sinclair Radionics' product line, selling off the watch and television lines, and brought in Norman Hewitt as a managing director to assist Sinclair. While Sinclair made efforts to work with Hewitt and the NEB, his relationship with these worsened, as the NEB had little faith in Sinclair's vision.

By 1979, the NEB opted to break up Sinclair Radionics, holding its instruments division as Sinclair Electronics, and selling its television division to Binatone and its calculator division to ESL Bristol. Sinclair himself left the company at this point. Effectively NEB wrote off its estimated £7 million investment into Sinclair Radionics as a loss. Sinclair was given a golden handshake and an estimated £10,000 package with the dissolution of his company.

=== Sinclair Research ===
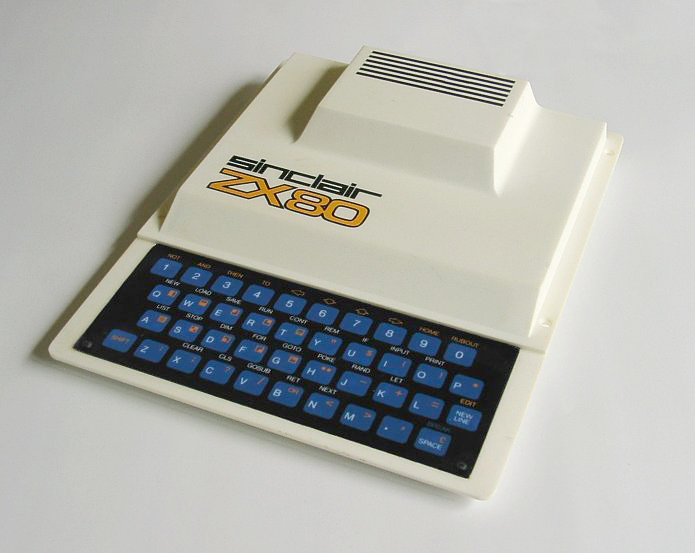
The ZX80 home computer was launched in 1980.

While Sinclair was dealing with the NEB and had seen problems developing, he had a former employee, Christopher Curry, establish a "lifeboat" company, called Science of Cambridge Ltd, in July 1977, called such as they were located near the University of Cambridge, and planned for Curry to develop technology from ideas from the school. An early product from Science of Cambridge was a wrist calculator kit, which helped to keep the company financially afloat.

By the time that Sinclair had left Radionics and joined Curry at Science of Cambridge, inexpensive microprocessors had started appearing on the market. Sinclair came up with the idea of selling a microprocessor teaching kit, and in June 1978, Science of Cambridge launched the MK14 kit, based on the National SC/MP chip, in June 1978. As Sinclair began working on the MK14's successor, Curry was in discussions with Hermann Hauser, and opted to leave Science of Cambridge to co-found Acorn Computers with Hauser in 1978. Acorn became a direct competitor to Sinclair's products, with the Acorn System 75 as its answer to the MK14, effectively an MK14 chip with a keyboard.

To follow up on the MK14, Sinclair started looking to build a personal computer. At around that time (1979), premade systems such as the Commodore PET cost about £700, and Sinclair believed he could get the price of a system to under £100. Keeping the cost low was also essential for Sinclair to avoid his products from becoming outpriced by American or Japanese equivalents as had happened to several of the Sinclair Radionics products. In May 1979, Jim Westwood, a former Sinclair Radionics employee Sinclair hired for this new company, started the ZX80 project at Science of Cambridge; it was launched in February 1980 at £79.95 in kit form and £99.95 ready-built. The ZX80 was immediately successful, and besides sales in the UK, Sinclair also sought to introduce the computer into the United States. Science of Cambridge was subsequently renamed Sinclair Computers Ltd, and then again to Sinclair Research Ltd.

On hearing that the BBC was preparing to run a television series to teach viewers about computing and programming, both Sinclair and Curry pressured the BBC to choose computers from their respective companies to use as the primary tool. This pushed the development of the Sinclair ZX81 ahead as Sinclair's standard for the BBC. The ZX81 was launched at £49.95 in kit form and £69.95 ready-built, by mail order. Ultimately, the BBC chose Acorn and standardized on a successor to the Acorn Atom—originally named Acorn Proton, but ultimately branded as the BBC Micro. Despite losing out to the BBC, Sinclair's push had established the ZX80 and ZX81 as one of the most-sold brands of computers across the UK and the United States as well as establishing a deal with distribution in Japan with Mitsui. A number of user groups, magazines and third party accessories for both computers started to appear.

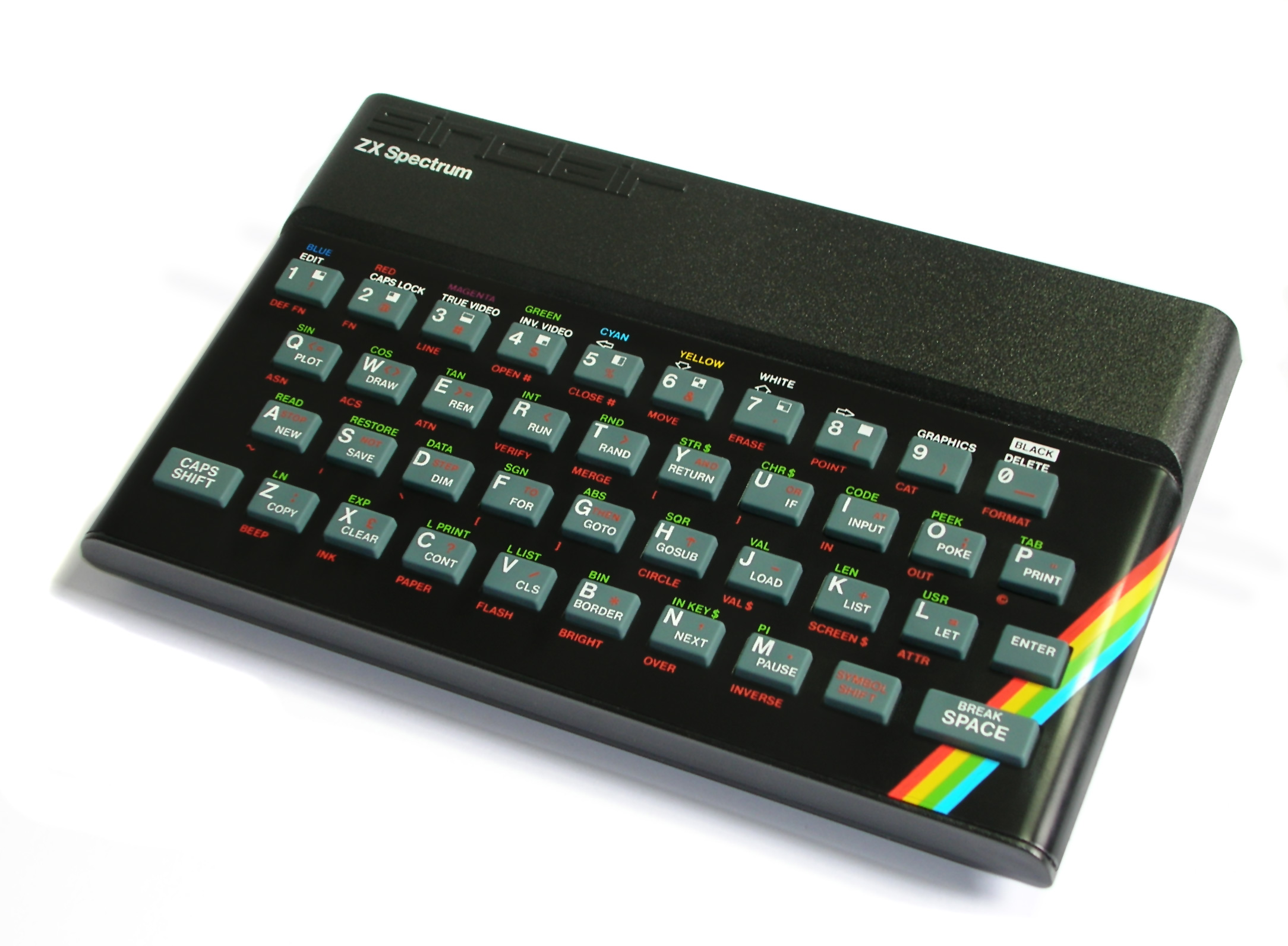
The ZX Spectrum was introduced in 1982.

In February 1982, Timex obtained a licence to manufacture and market Sinclair's computers in the United States under the name Timex Sinclair. In April, the ZX Spectrum was launched at £125 for the 16 kB RAM version and £175 for the 48 kB version. It was the first computer in the ZX line to support colour output. The ZX Spectrum remained more affordable than other computers on the market, including the BBC Micro, VIC-20, and Apple II, and during a time of recession and high unemployment in the UK, was positioned by Sinclair as a low-cost home computer for productivity applications. However, it also proved to be a popular gift for teenagers and young adults that year. This led to a number of these young people learning to program on the ZX Spectrum, using its newfound colour support, to make quirky video games inspired by British humour which they sold through word of mouth and mail order. So-called "bedroom coders" using the ZX Spectrum gave rise to the start of the UK's video game industry. By 1984, over 3,500 games had been released for the ZX Spectrum.

The popularity of the ZX Spectrum spread to Western Europe. While Sinclair could not export into Eastern European countries still within the Soviet bloc at the time, numerous low-cost clones of the ZX Spectrum sprang up within these countries, further boosting the start of video game development by similar bedroom coders. The ZX Spectrum went on to become the UK's most-sold computer, selling more than 5 million units before it was discontinued in 1992. Sinclair Research computers accounted for 45% of the British market in 1984, including those from British and American companies.

The continued success of the computer market continued to help boost Sinclair Research's profit. In 1982, the company had a pre-tax profit of £9.2 million on a turnover of £27.6 million. Sinclair himself was estimated to a net value of over £100 million in 1983, two years after launching the first of the ZX computers. With the additional funds, Sinclair converted the Barker & Wadsworth mineral water bottling factory into the company's headquarters in 1982. In January 1983, American news magazine Time named the personal computer the 1982 "Machine of the Year", and Sinclair was one of six individuals from the computing industry who were spotlighted in the accompanying feature.

=== Sinclair Vehicles and market decline ===
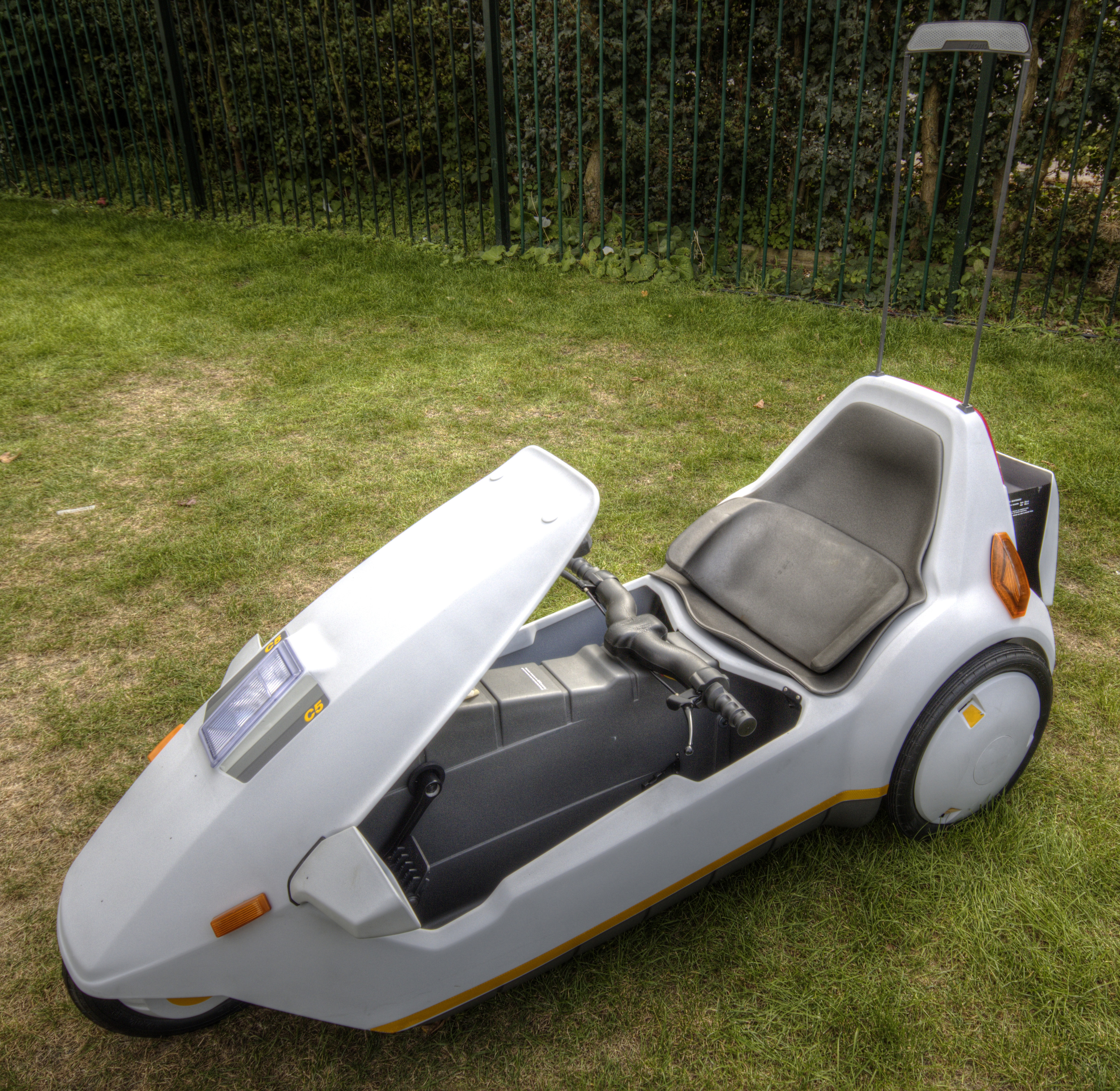
Sinclair C5 electric vehicle (launched in 1985)

As Sinclair Research continued to be successful, Sinclair launched a new company, Sinclair Vehicles Ltd., in March 1983 to develop electric vehicles, using 10% of the capital generated by Sinclair Research and selling some of his own shares to fund the new venture. Sinclair had an interest in electric vehicles since the 1970s at Sinclair Radionics, and had been working with Tony Wood Rogers, a former Radionics employee, since 1979 to start developing prototypes of a new vehicle for the market. The company's only product was the Sinclair C5 which launched in January 1985.

The Sinclair C5 was considered a significant failure, having been developed without any market research. It was widely criticised and widely ridiculed for its high price, its toy-like appearance, lack of safety features and exposure to the elements, and the need for the user to pedal the vehicle up steeper hills. Whilst Sinclair had anticipated 100,000 C5's would be sold in the first year, 14,000 units were produced and 4,500 sold before the C5 line was terminated in August that same year.

Another noted misfire for Sinclair was the Sinclair Research TV80, a flatscreen portable mini television utilising a cathode-ray tube, which took several years to develop, and by the time the TV80 was ready for market in 1983, the Sony Watchman had been released in Japan in 1982. Furthermore, LCD television technology was already in advanced development to bypass the limitations of CRT. The TV80 was considered a commercial flop, with 15,000 units being produced. Despite these commercial failures, both the C5 and TV80 have since been considered products ahead of their time, with the C5 a precursor to the modern day electric car and the TV80 comparable to watching videos on smartphones.

Sinclair continued to direct Sinclair Research as they continued the ZX Spectrum line of computers through 1983 and 1984 as well as launching the Sinclair QL (short for Quantum Leap) brand in 1984 intended to compete with business lines of computers from IBM and Apple but at about half their cost. However, towards the end of 1984, the market for personal computers in the United Kingdom became cautious; Sinclair Research had entered into a small price war with Acorn Computers. The price drops meant that consumers saw these computers more as toys than productivity tools, and Sinclair Research missed its planned sales milestones for the 1984 holiday season. Into 1985, Acorn fell under investigation which propagated solvency concerns throughout the computer industry, including Sinclair Research. Robert Maxwell, the owner of The Daily Mirror and Pergamon Press, planned to help Sinclair Research through its £12 million acquisition via Pergamon's Hollis Brothers division, announced in June 1985. However the deal was aborted in August 1985 as Sinclair found an offer with the Dixons Group of £10 million.

The lack of funds for Sinclair Research and the failure of the C5 created financial difficulties for Sinclair. Sinclair Vehicles was placed into receivership by October 1985, and in April 1986, Sinclair sold the bulk of Sinclair Research to Amstrad for £5 million. Sinclair Research Ltd. was reduced to an R&D business and holding company, with shareholdings in several spin-off companies, formed to exploit technologies developed by the company. These included Anamartic Ltd. (wafer-scale integration) and Cambridge Computer Ltd. (Z88 portable computer and satellite television receivers).

=== Later years ===
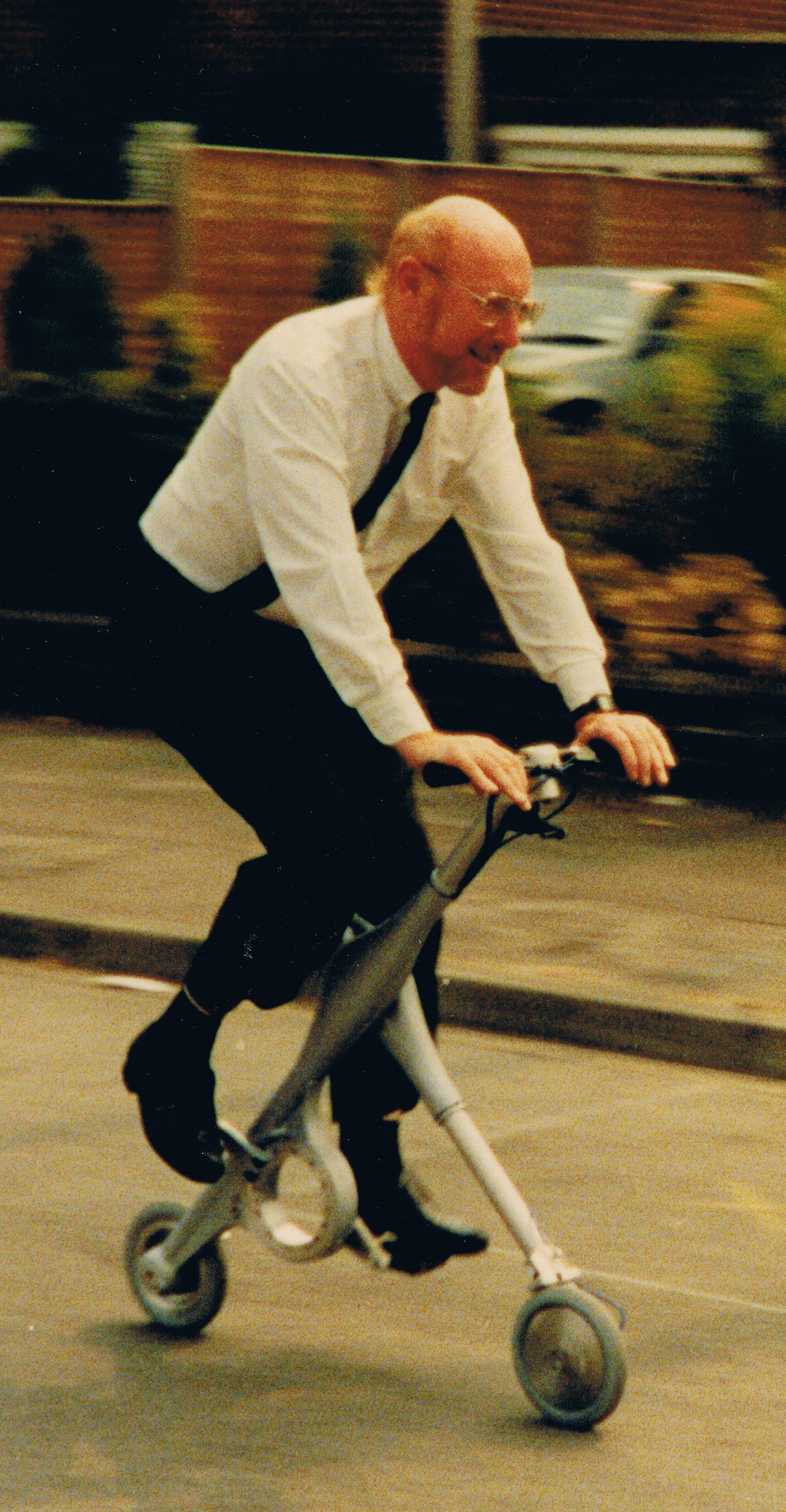
Sinclair on an X-Bike prototype

By 1990, Sinclair Research consisted of Sinclair and two other employees down from 130 employees at its peak in 1985, and its activities later concentrated on personal transport, including the Zike electric bicycle. By 2003, Sinclair Research was collaborating with Hong Kong-based firm Daka. A laboratory was set up for Daka near Croydon to develop products on a royalty basis. The two firms collaborated on a Sea Scooter and a wheelchair drive. In 1997, he invented the Sinclair X1, which was a radio the size of a 10p coin.

Sinclair had planned to introduce the Sinclair X-1 through Sinclair Research, another attempt at a personal electric vehicle following the Sinclair C5. The X-1 was first announced in 2010, and incorporated design aspects that the C5 had been panned for, including an open egg-like shell for the rider with a more ergonomic seat, a more powerful motor and larger battery storage, and an effectively lower cost accounting for inflation than the C5. However, the X-1 failed to reach the market.

== Recognition ==
Sinclair received several honours for his contributions towards helping establish the personal computer industry in the United Kingdom. In 1983, he was awarded Honorary Degrees of Doctor of Science by the University of Bath, Heriot-Watt University and University of Warwick. He was knighted in the Queen's 1983 Birthday Honours List. In 1984, he was honoured by Imperial College London by being made a fellow. In 1988, London's National Portrait Gallery purchased a portrait of Sinclair by photographer Simon Lewis for its permanent collection.

== Personal life ==
Sinclair was a poker player and appeared in the first three series of the Late Night Poker on Channel 4. He won the first series final of the Celebrity Poker Club spin-off. Sinclair was an atheist. He had an IQ of 159, and was a member of Mensa, and chairman from 1980 to 1997. He also participated in marathons including several New York City Marathons.

Despite his involvement in computing, Sinclair did not use the Internet, stating that he does not like to have "technical or mechanical things around me" as it distracts from the process of invention. In 2010, he said that he did not use computers, and preferred using the telephone rather than email. In 2014, he predicted, "Once you start to make machines that are rivalling and surpassing humans with intelligence, it's going to be very difficult for us to survive. It's just an inevitability."

His first marriage with Ann ended in divorce after twenty years around 1985 due to the pressure from the ongoing financial issues he had with his companies. From his marriage with Ann, he had three children. In 1988/89 Sinclair was briefly engaged to the future television presenter and author Bernadette Tynan, then 22 years old, whom he had met at a Mensa meeting. Tynan subsequently broke off the engagement. In 2010 Sinclair married Angie Bowness, a former dancer at a Stringfellows nightclub and who represented England for Miss Europe 1995. This second marriage lasted for seven years before also ending in divorce.

On 16 September 2021, Sinclair died aged 81 in London following an illness related to cancer that he had for over a decade. Sinclair was remembered on his death for his contributions towards computing and video games by numerous people, including Elon Musk, Satya Nadella, the Oliver Twins, Debbie Bestwick, Charles Cecil, and David Braben. A Times leader following his death described Sinclair as a tenacious inventor whose career was a triumph of perseverance similar to that of many of Britain's greatest inventors, such as James Dyson and Alexander Graham Bell, 'who are a reminder that failure is an essential prelude to success'.

== Publications ==
Sinclair authored electronics constructor books for Bernard Babani publishers:

- Barnards 148 : Practical Transistor Receivers Book 1; 1959. (30 circuits)
- Barnards 149 : Practical Stereo Handbook; 1959.
- Barnards 151 : Transistor Receivers Book 2 - Transistor Superhet Receivers; 1960. (50 circuits)
- Barnards 163 : Transistor Circuits Manual 2; 1960. (13 circuits)
- Barnards 167 : Transistor Circuits Manual 3 - Eleven Tested Transistor Circuits using Prefabricated Circuit Units; 1960. (11 circuits)
- Barnards 168 : Transistor Circuits Manual 4; 1960. (11 circuits)
- Barnards 173 : Practical Transistor Audio Amplifiers for the Home Constructor Book 1; 1961. (32 circuits)
- Barnards 174 : Transistor Subminiature Receivers Handbook for the Home Constructor; 1961.
- Barnards 175 : Transistorized Test Equipment and Servicing Manual; 1961.
- Barnards 176 : Transistor Audio Amplifier Manual; 1962. (32 circuits)
- Barnards 177 : Modern Transistor Circuits for Beginners; 1962. (35 circuits)
- Barnards 179 : Transistor Circuits Manual 5; 1963. (14 circuits)
- Barnards 181 : 22 Tested Circuits Using Micro Alloy Transistors; 1963. (22 circuits)
