= MTV-1 =

Portable television by Clive Sinclair

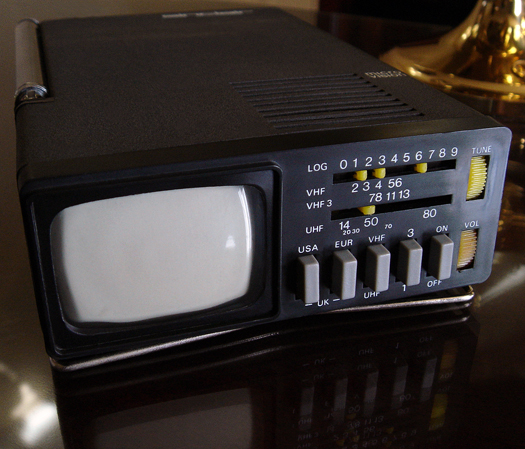
Front view of Sinclair MTV-1

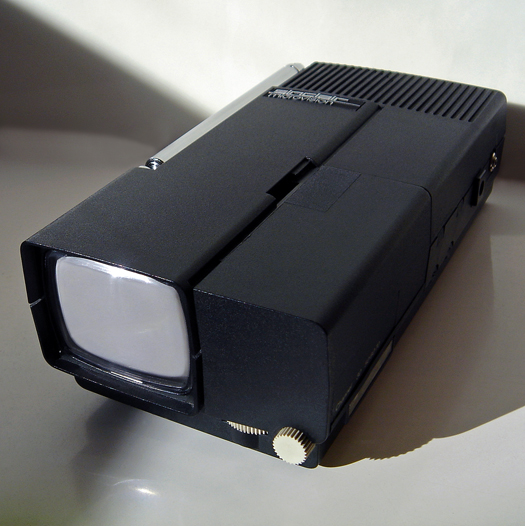
Sinclair MTV-1B

The MTV-1 Micro TV was the second model of a near pocket-sized television. The first was the Panasonic IC model TR-001 introduced in 1970. The MTV-1 was developed by Clive Sinclair (Sinclair Radionics Ltd). It was shown to the public at trade shows in London and Chicago in January, 1977, and released for sale in 1978. Development spanned 10 years and included £1.6 million from the UK government in 1976.

The MTV-1 used an AEG Telefunken 2-inch (5.1 cm) black-and-white, electrostatic deflection cathode ray tube (CRT) and included a rechargeable 4-AA-cell NiCad battery pack. It measured 4×6.25×1.625 inches (101.6×158.8×41.3 mm) and weighed 28 ounces (790 g). It was able to receive either PAL or NTSC transmissions on VHF or UHF, the world's first multi-standard TV. A Welsh company, Wolsey Electronics, manufactured it for Sinclair. Custom ICs made by Texas Instruments and Sinclair contributed to its small size and low power consumption.

The original US$395 (about £205) price tag proved to be too high to sell many of them, and Sinclair lost over £1.8 million in 1978, eventually selling its remaining inventory to liquidators at greatly reduced prices.

The MTV-1B, released later in 1978 at the much lower price of £99, was able to receive only System I UHF signals.

== Sources ==
- Retro thing
