= Sinclair X-1 =

Electrically assisted faired recumbent bicycle

The Sinclair X-1 was a two-wheel electric vehicle invented in Britain by Sir Clive Sinclair. The X-1 was announced in November 2010 and was expected to be available from July 2011 at the price of £595. However, it failed to reach the market.
