= Handheld television =

Portable device for watching television

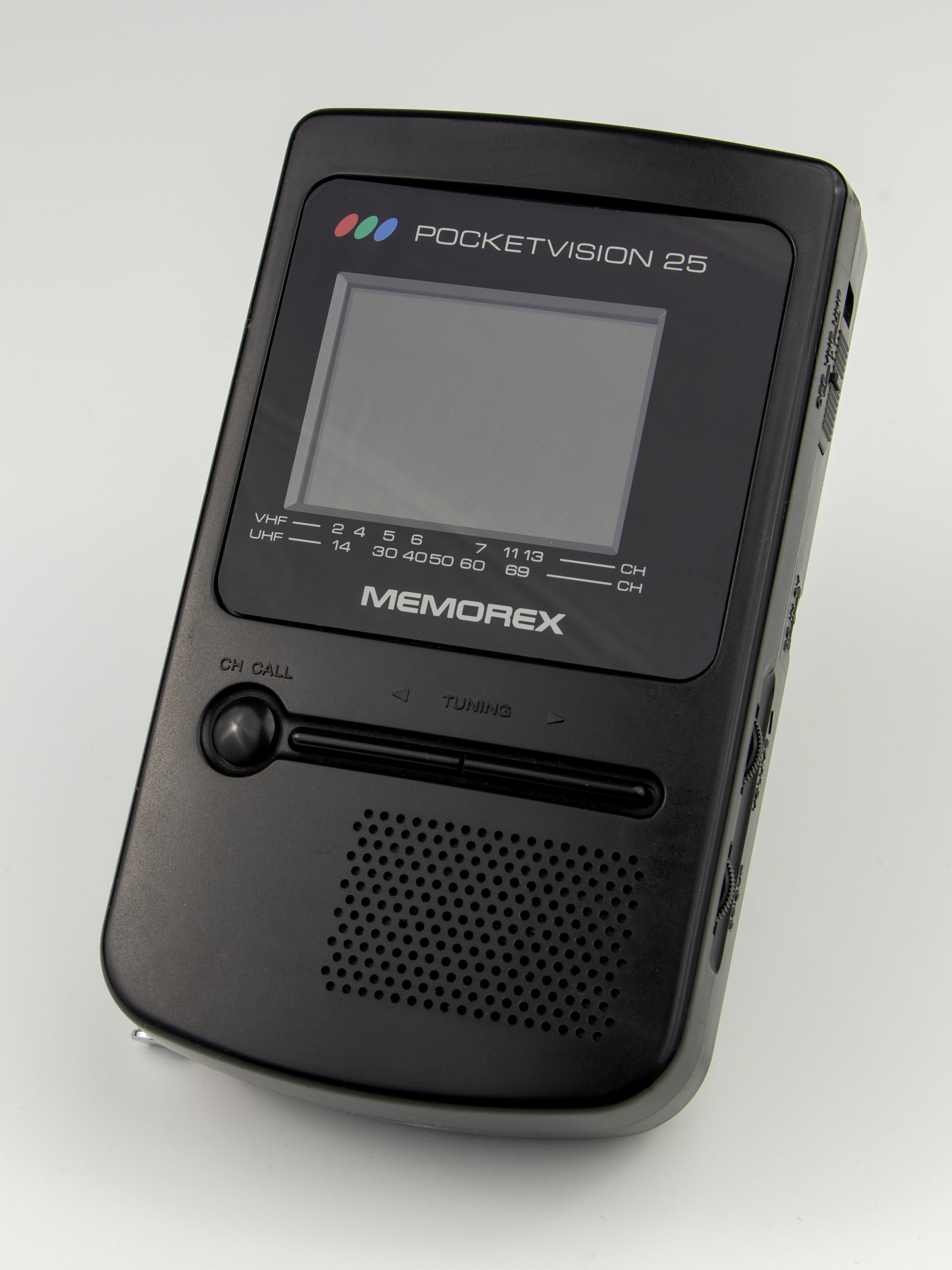
Memorex Pocketvision 25 handheld television, from the 1980s

A handheld television is a portable device for watching television that usually uses a TFT LCD or OLED and CRT color display. Many of these devices resemble handheld transistor radios. Unlike smartphones and tablets which have apps for viewing one's entire pay-TV subscription on them, handheld TVs are only able to receive local TV stations.

== History ==
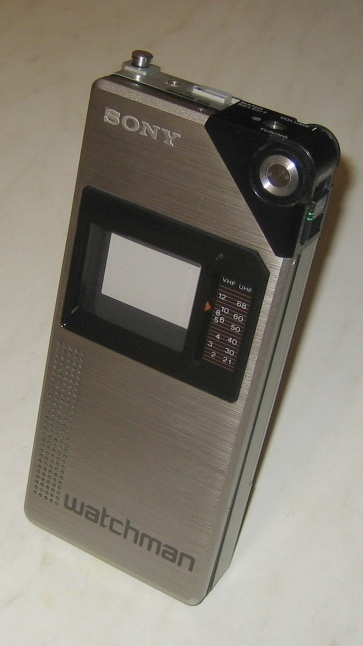
Sony Watchman

In 1970, Panasonic released the first TV which was small enough to fit in a large pocket; called the Panasonic IC TV MODEL TR-001 and Sinclair Research released the second pocket television, the MTV-1. Since LCD technology was not yet mature at the time, the TV used a minuscule CRT which set the record for being the smallest CRT on a commercially marketed product.

Later in 1982, Sony released their first model - the FD-200, which was introduced as “Flat TV” later renamed after the nickname Watchman, a play on the word Walkman. It had grayscale video at first. Several years later, a color model with an active-matrix LCD was released. Some smartphones integrate a television receiver, although Internet broadband video is far more common.

Since the switch-over to digital broadcasting, handheld TVs have reduced in size and improved in quality. Portable TV was eventually brought to digital TV with DVB-H, although it didn't see much success.

== Hardware ==
Elements of a pocket television CRT: (1) Recessed Screen, (2) Electron Beam, (3) Electron Gun

These devices often have stereo 1/8 inch (3.5 mm) phono plugs for composite video-analog mono audio relay to serve them as composite monitors; also, some models have mono 3.5 mm jacks for the broadcast signal that is usually relayed via F connector or Belling-Lee connector on standard television models.

Some include HDMI, USB and SD ports.

Screen sizes vary from 1.3 to 5 inches (33 to 127 mm). Some handheld televisions also double as portable DVD players and USB personal video recorders.

== Size ==
Portable televisions cannot fit in a pocket, but often run on batteries and include a cigarette lighter receptacle plug.

Pocket televisions fit in a pocket.

Wearable televisions sometimes are made in the form of a wristwatch.

== Notable brands and models ==
- RCA - DPTM70R
- Sony - Watchman and Bravia
- Casio
- Sanyo
- Sinclair Research - MTV-1 and TV80

== See also ==
- Handheld electronics
