= Sony Watchman =

Line of portable televisions

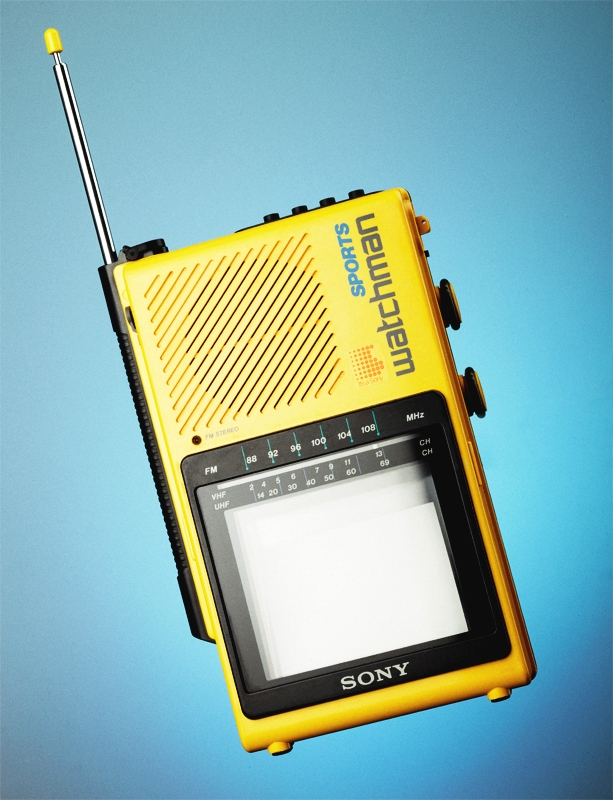
Sony Sports Watchman

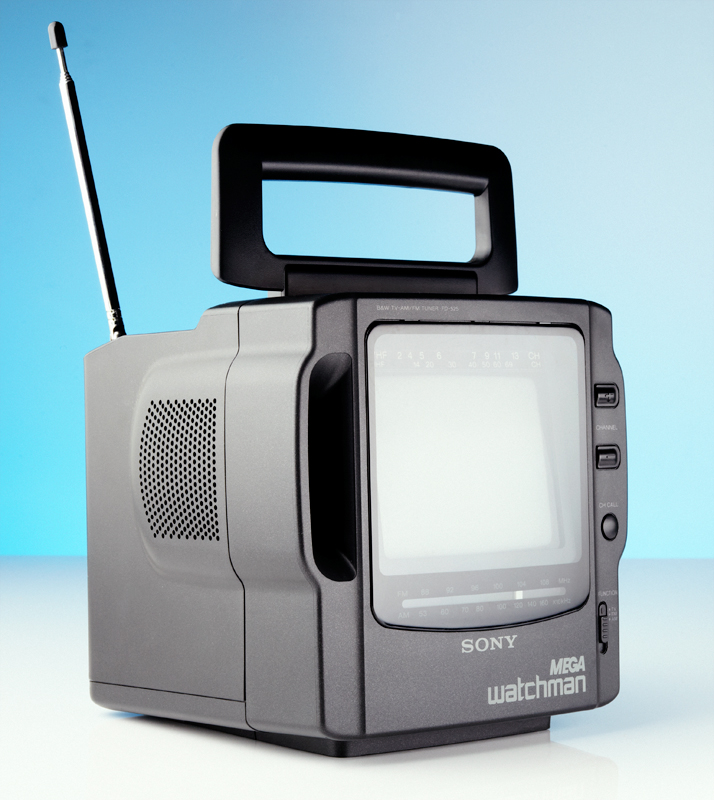
Sony MEGA Watchman

The Sony Watchman is a line of portable pocket televisions trademarked and produced by Sony. The line was introduced in 1982 and discontinued in 2000.

Its name came from a portmanteau formed of "Watch" (watching television) and "man" from Sony's Walkman personal cassette audio players. There were more than 65 models of the Watchman before its discontinuation. As the models progressed, display size increased and new features were added. Due to the switch to digital broadcasting, most models of the Sony Watchman can no longer be used to receive live television broadcasts without the use of a digital converter box.

== FD-210 ==
The initial model was introduced in 1982 as the FD-210 (FD-200 in Japan), which had a black & white five-centimeter (2") Cathode-ray tube display. The device weighed around 650 grams (23 oz), with a measurement of 87 x 198 x 33 millimeters (3½" x 7¾" x 1¼"). The device was sold in Japan with a price of 54,800 yen. Roughly two years later, in 1984, the device was introduced to Europe and North America.

== Later releases ==
Sony manufactured more than 65 models of the Watchman before its discontinuation in 2000. Upon the release of further models after the FD-210, the display size increased, and new features were introduced. The FD-3, introduced in 1987, had a built-in digital clock. The FD-30, introduced in 1984 had a built-in AM/FM Stereo radio. The FD-40/42/44/45 were among the largest Watchmen, utilizing a 4" CRT display. The FD-40 introduced a single composite A/V input. The FD-45, introduced in 1986, was water-resistant. In 1988/1989, the FDL 330S color Watchman TV/Monitor with LCD was introduced. In 1990, the FDL-310, a Watchman with a color LCD was introduced. The FD-280/285, made from 1990 to 1994, was the last Watchman to use a black and white CRT display. One of the last Watchmen was the FDL-22 introduced in 1998, which featured an ergonomic body which made it easier to hold, and introduced Sony's Straptenna, where the wrist strap served as the antenna.

== Marketing and media ==
A model of the Sony Watchman (FD-40A) is seen multiple times in the film Rain Man, and the FD-210 is in The Jönsson Gang Gets Gold Fever.

== Gallery ==
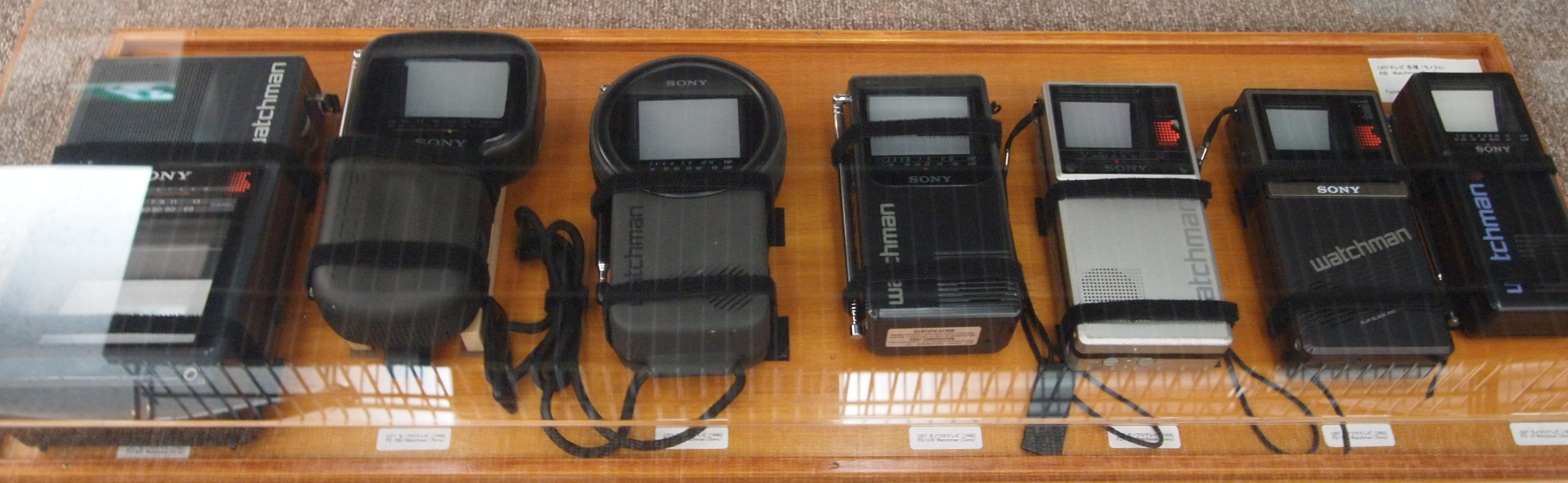
Various models of Sony Watchmen

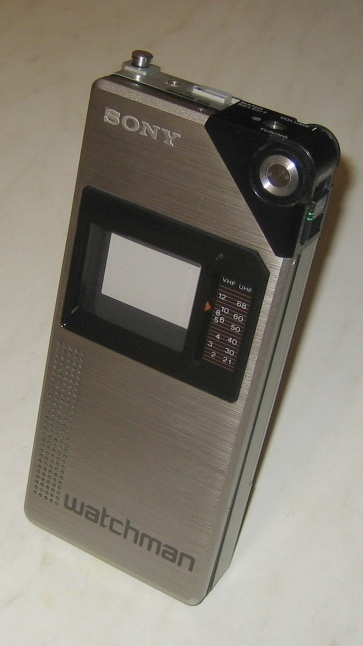
A Sony FD-210 Watchman

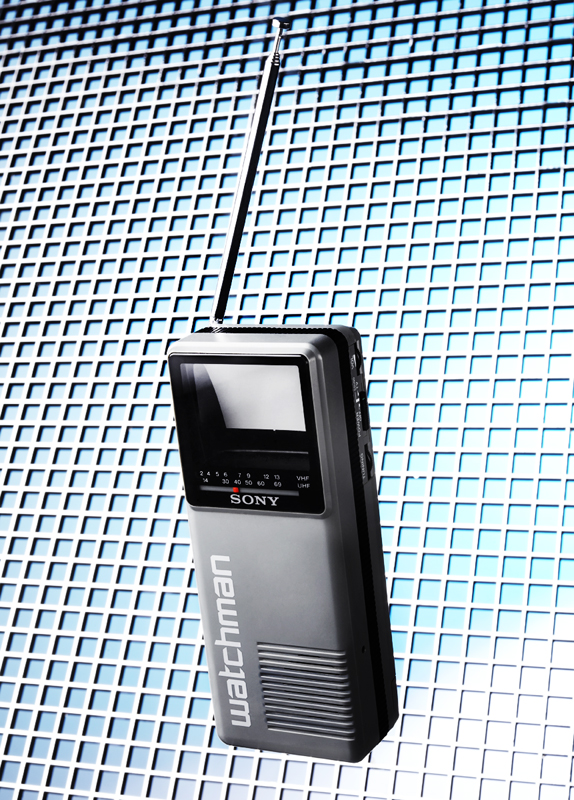
A Sony FD-10 Pocket Watchman
