= Harry's =

American shaving equipment company

Harry's Inc.

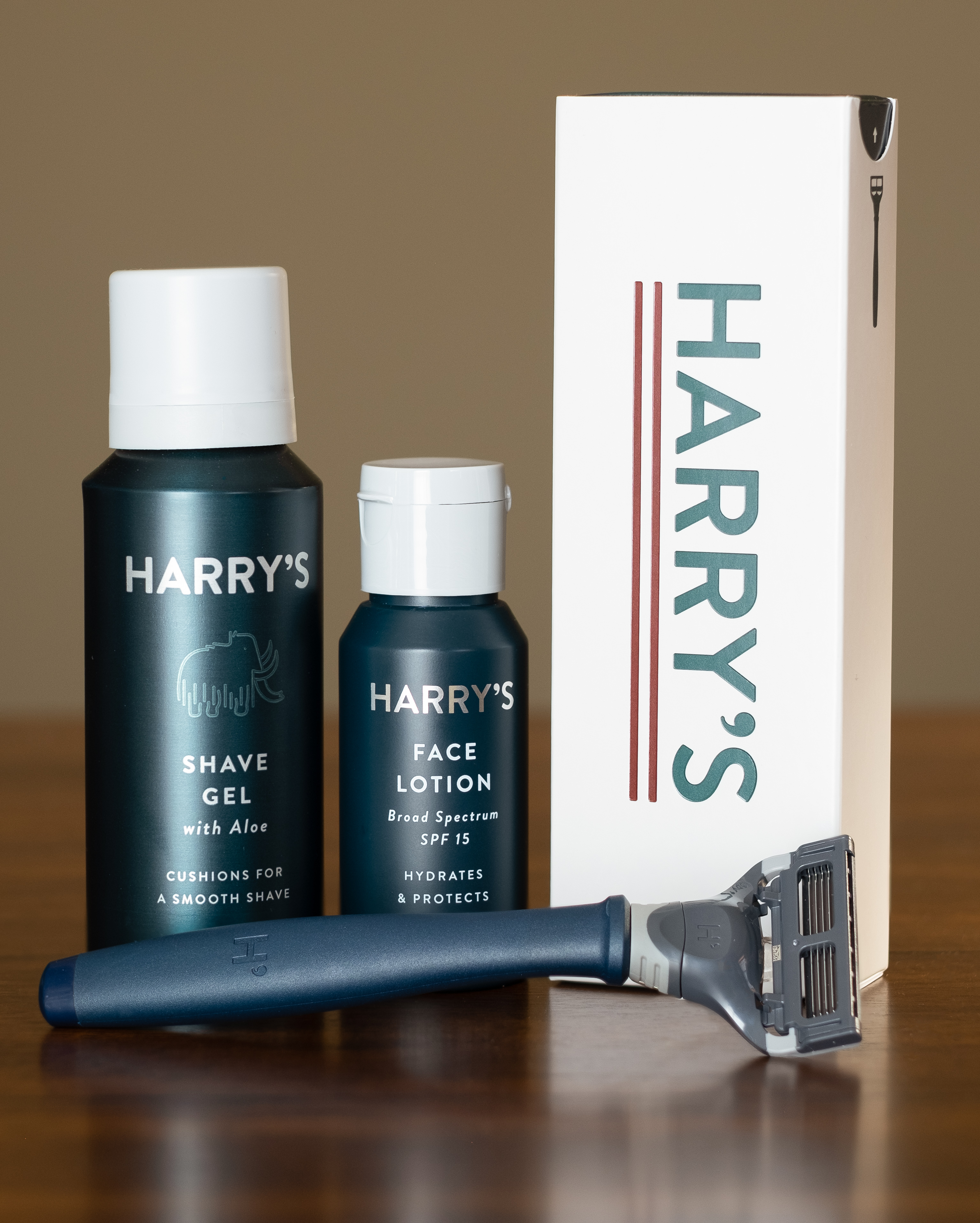
- Some products sold by Harry's; a five-blade razor, shaving gel, and face lotion
- Type: Private
- Industry: Consumer packaged goods
- Founded: July 2, 2012; 14 years ago
- Founders: Andy Katz-Mayfield; Jeff Raider
- Headquarters: New York City
- Area served: United States; Canada; United Kingdom; Japan
- Number of employees: 900+
- Website: www.harrys.com

Harry's is an American manufacturer and seller of shaving equipment and men's personal care products via online and retail channels. They utilise a subscription service where customers receive new razor blades, shaving cream, and other grooming products by mail.

Based in New York City, it was founded in 2012 by Andy Katz-Mayfield and Jeff Raider and launched its subscription service a year later. In 2014, Harry's purchased the Feintechnik razor factory in Germany.

In May 2019, Edgewell Personal Care announced it would purchase Harry's. In February 2020, the Federal Trade Commission sued Edgewell to block the merger, stating that the merger could hurt competition.

== History ==
The company was founded in July 2012 by Andy Katz-Mayfield and Jeff Raider, who met at Bain & Co. It launched its direct-to-consumer subscription service in March 2013.

The original products were designed by Prime Studio Inc., and the branding was developed by the creative agency Partners & Spade (now known as Mythology), who collaborated to create the company's initial range of launch products and packaging.

In January 2014, Harry's acquired the German razor blade manufacturer Feintechnik for $100 million, in an effort to provide control over the entire process of manufacturing their products.

In 2015, the company received a third-round financing of US$75.6 million. In an interview published in July 2016, Katz-Mayfield said Harry's had two million customers.

By January 2017, its shaving products were also available at Target and Walmart stores. In late June, it started selling its products in the United Kingdom.

In February 2018, Harry's raised $112 million in Series D funding co-led by Alliance Consumer Growth and Temasek co-led, with participation from Tao Capital Partners. In October, Harry's launched Flamingo, a women's skin care brand.

In May 2019, Edgewell Personal Care, the owner of the Schick brand of shaving products, announced plans to purchase Harry's for $1.4 billion. The merger was intended to finalise by the end of the first quarter of 2020.

On February 3, 2020, the Federal Trade Commission sued Edgewell to block the merger, stating that bringing Schick and Harry's together could hurt competition and Edgewell backed away from the deal.

In March 2021, Forbes reported that Harry's had raised a Series E round at a $1.7 billion valuation. In December, Harry's announced it would acquire deodorant brand Lumē for an undisclosed price.

By 2023, the product line generated $300 million out of a total $750 million in annual revenue for the company. In 2025, a year after Reuters reported that Harry's had filed to go public in an IPO, the firm unveiled its first major rebrand since launching in 2013, updating its logo, packaging, website, and visual identity.

== Manufacturing ==
Harry's razor blades are manufactured at Feintechnik GmbH Eisfeld in Eisfeld, Germany. Feintechnik was founded in 1920, and was later nationalised in 1948 as VEB Feintechnik Eisfeld, which was later privatized by German government agency Treuhand in 1990. Feintechnik was acquired by Harry's in January 2014 for $100 million. The handles of the Harry's razors are manufactured in China.

== Business model ==
Similar to Warby Parker, which was also co-founded by Jeff Raider, Harry's began with a buy-one-donate-one business model, donating a free razor blade (or the cost of one) to charitable organizations. The program started in 2013 by supporting The Mission Continues to help veterans returning from Iraq and Afghanistan, and it was called the "Give a Shave" program.

By the end of 2013, the "Give a Shave" program had changed slightly such that Harry's would donate 1% of their sales and the employees would donate 1% of their time to charitable organizations like City Year. Currently, the donation model remains 1% of sales, and employees now receive five days of paid time off to volunteer with a registered non-profit organization. Various charities have received this benefit, and Harry's has recently focused on promoting better mental health care for men and suicide prevention, making news for working with organizations such as Campaign Against Living Miserably (CALM), HEADstrong Foundation, and The Trevor Project.

== See also ==
- Dollar Shave Club
- Warby Parker
- Away
- Outdoor Voices
