= Wilkinson Sword =

British safety razor brand

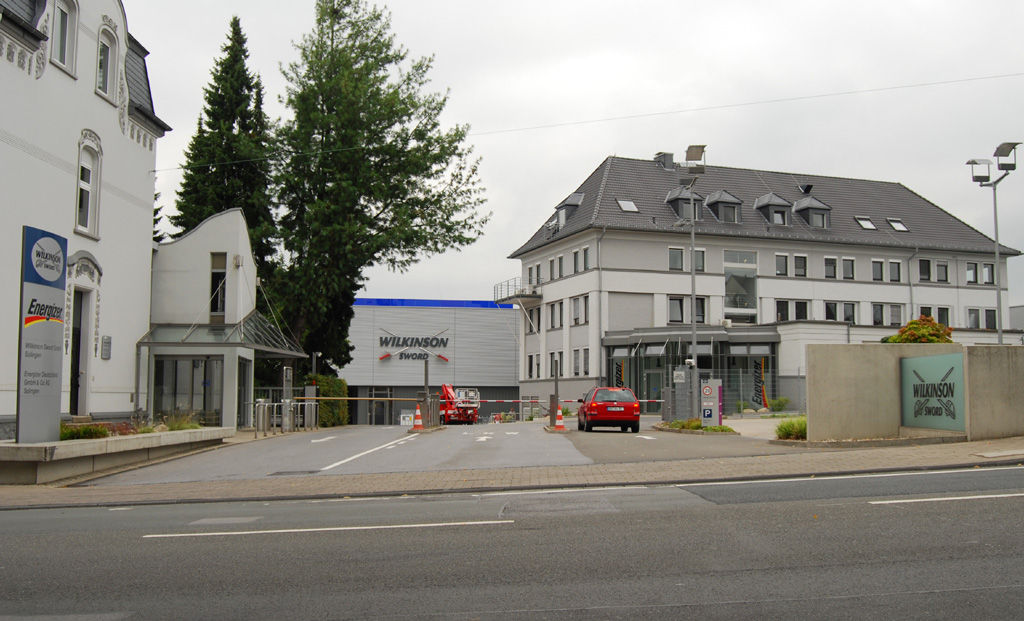
- Wilkinson Sword plant in Solingen, Germany
- Formerly: List: Nock, Jover & Co. (1772–1804); James Wilkinson & Son (1804–1891); Wilkinson Sword Company (1891–1973); Wilkinson Match (1973–78); Wilkinson Sword (1978–present)
- Company type: Private (1772–1978)
- Industry: Arms; Metallurgy; Automotive
- Founded: 1772; 254 years ago in Shotley Bridge, U.K.
- Founder: Henry Nock
- Fate: After several takeovers, the Wilkinson brand was added to Edgewell when it spun-off from Energizer Holdings in 2015
- Headquarters: United Kingdom (1772–1998); Germany (1998–present)
- Products: Safety razors, swords, guns, bayonets, typewriters, pruning shears, scissors, motorcycles
- Brands: Schick (1992)
- Owner: List: Edgewell Personal Care (2015–present); Energizer Holdings (2003–15); Pfizer (2000–03); Warner-Lambert (1992–2000); Eemland Holdings (1989–92); Swedish Match (1978–89); Allegheny Ludlum (1978) (Note: Sold the company after filling bankruptcy.)
- Subsidiaries: Scripto (1973)
- Website: wilkinsonsword.com

Wilkinson Sword is a British brand selling razors and other personal care products, currently owned by Edgewell Personal Care. The company was founded as a manufacturer of guns made in Shotley Bridge in County Durham, by Henry Nock in London in 1772.

Besides guns, the company has also produced swords, bayonets and products such as typewriters, garden shears, scissors and motorcycles. Gardening equipment is still made under the Wilkinson Sword name by E.P. Barrus under a licensing arrangement. Wilkinson Sword has manufactured its products in three UK locations over the years: in London (Chelsea and Acton), Cramlington in Northumberland, and Bridgend in Wales, where it made gardening tools. In 2000, the company closed its razor plant in the UK and consolidated production in Germany. In 2014, the company further moved most of its production to the Czech Republic.

== History ==
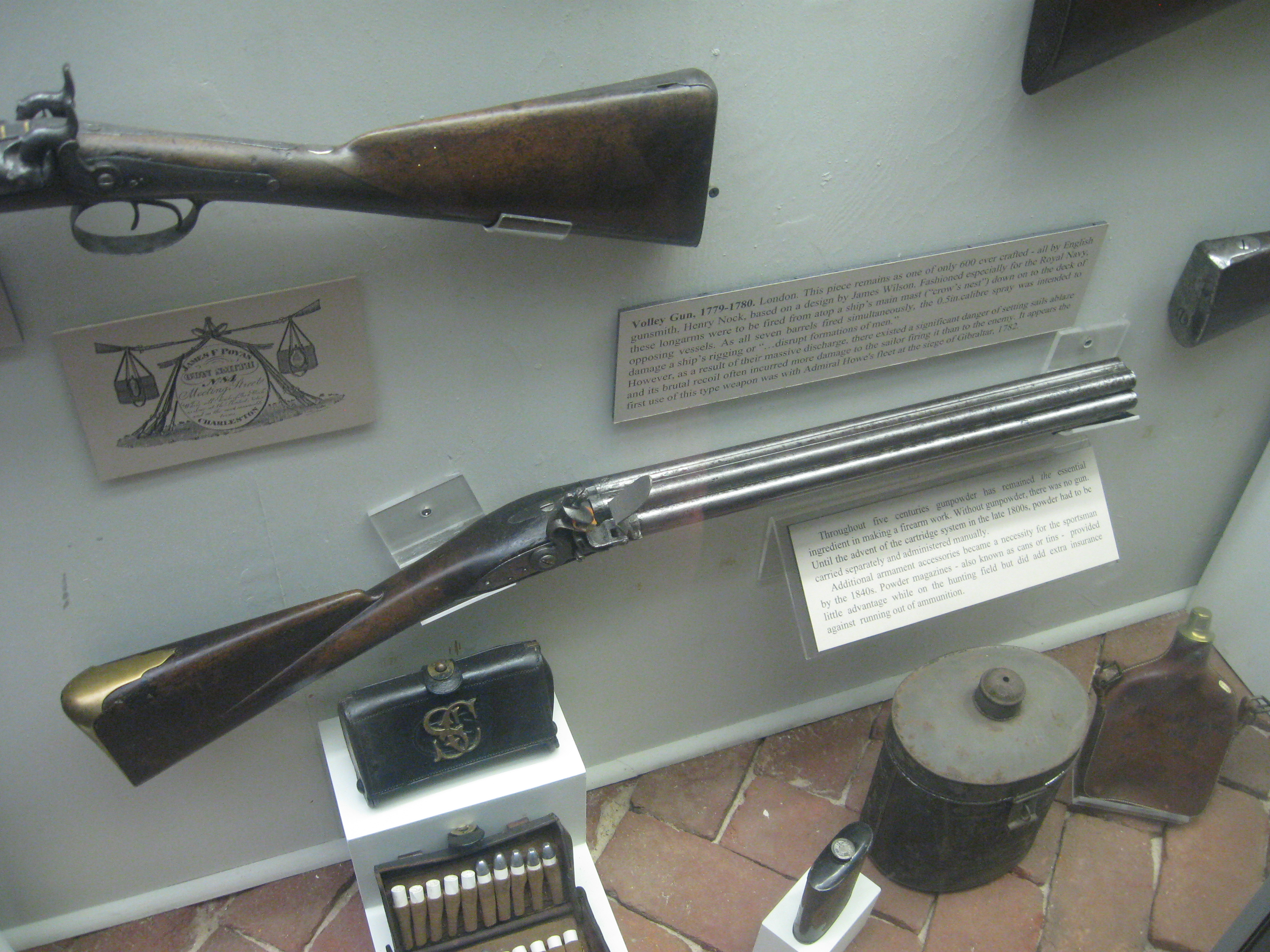
A Nock Volley Gun (1779–1780)

Henry Nock began trading as a gunlock smith out of Mount Pleasant in London in 1772. In 1775, he formed "Nock, Jover & Co." with William Jover and John Green. The American Revolutionary War led to strong sales for the new company. In 1776, the Board of Ordnance granted Nock, Jover & Co. an advance of £200 to start producing bayonets and in 1779 the company won a contract to produce 500 seven-barreled volley guns for the Royal Navy. Although designed by James Wilson, these would become known as Nock volley guns or Nock guns.

When Henry Nock died in 1804, he left the company to his foreman and adopted son-in-law, James Wilkinson. When James's son Henry Wilkinson joined the company it was renamed "James Wilkinson & Son" (also known as simply "Wilkinson & Son"). It became the "Wilkinson Sword Company" in 1891.

=== Motorcycle production ===
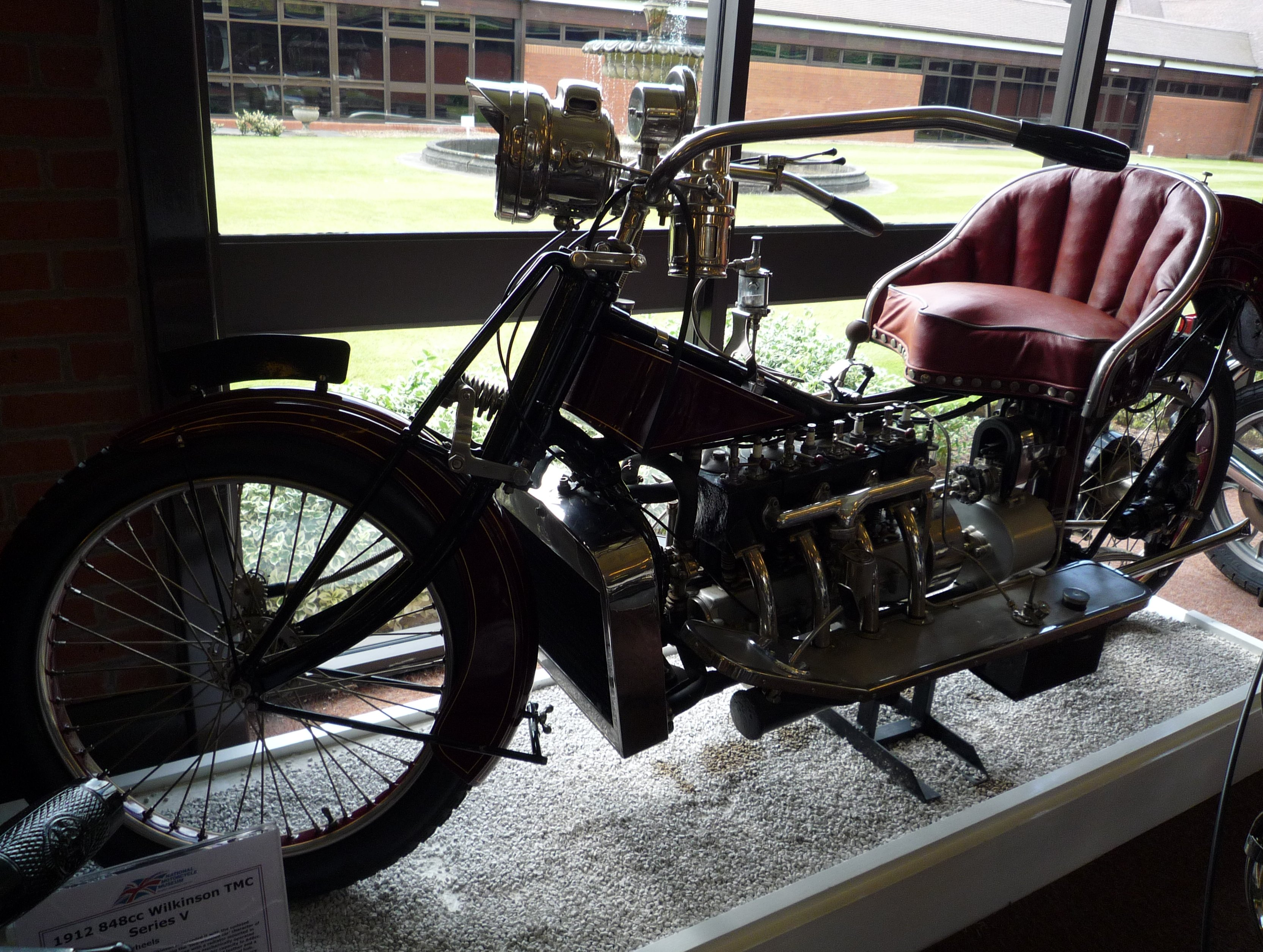
Wilkinson TMC 850cc motorcycle

Wilkinson Sword produced some of the earliest motorcycles in 1903. These were two-cylinder machines with Belgian engines made by Antoine, which were marketed by a garage in Chelsea, London – one of the first motorcycle dealerships in the UK. The venture was not a success.

Wilkinson developed and manufactured the Wilkinson TMC, a luxury touring motorcycle between 1911 and 1916, when production was stopped by World War I. The first 'Wilkinsons' were designed for military reconnaissance by P G Tacchi. Demonstrated to the British military in the summer of 1908, the Wilkinson motorcycle failed to impress the authorities, despite optional accessories including a sidecar complete with Maxim machine gun – and a steering wheel instead of handlebars.

The company continued development and exhibited a new version a year later at the Stanley Clyde Motorcycle Show at the Agricultural Hall, Islington, London in 1909. Only about 250 Wilkinsons were produced before World War I. Restrictions brought the line to its end in spring 1916, and Wilkinson then produced thousands of bayonets for the war effort. After the war, they continued to develop the in-line four engine – but in a new car called the Deemster. They never resumed motorcycle production.

=== World War II ===
Wilkinson Sword began producing the Fairbairn–Sykes fighting knife for British Commandos and special forces during World War II. This knife became widely used by many militaries around the world. Wilkinson's Pall Mall sideline in bulletproof vests also proved instrumental in the design and early fabrication of 'flak vests' used by USAAF aircrew.

=== Stainless steel razor blades ===
In 1962, Wilkinson Sword introduced stainless steel razor blades. Soon the company's blades made rapid gains in market share because one blade, though somewhat more expensive, could be used for a week. The earlier carbon steel razor blades rusted quickly enough that many people used a new blade daily.

Although Wilkinson gained a larger percentage of the market, the demand for razor blades declined to approximately 14% of its previous level. This introduction gave Wilkinson a significant market share. Previous market leaders responded by introducing their own stainless blades. The technology had been available for some time, but the market leaders such as Gillette, which held a patent on stainless blades, presumably knew that any gain for them in market share would be overwhelmed by the dramatic reduction in the size of the market.

=== Merger with British Match ===
In 1973, Wilkinson Sword merged with the British Match Corporation to form "Wilkinson Match". This was intended to create a stronger company, with a larger advertising budget that would enable the company to fight its American rival in the consumer shaving market, the Gillette Company, and its British subsidiary, also called Gillette. In this advertising war, Wilkinson Sword loudly touted its long and proud tradition of bladesmithing in its print and electronic media advertisements. That same year Wilkinson purchased the American pen and lighter company Scripto, Inc. in an attempt to diversify its holdings.

Allegheny Ludlum Industries of Pittsburgh purchased Wilkinson Match in 1978. After becoming Allegheny International, Inc., the company filed for bankruptcy reorganization in 1987. Allegheny sold Wilkinson Match in 1986 to Swedish Match, which merged with Stora Group two years later. In 1989, American corporation Gillette helped finance a buyout of the Swedish Match consumer products division, which included Wilkinson Sword, by the Netherlands-based Eemland Holdings, giving Gillette a 22% stake in Eemland. After Gillette was ordered by the European Community Commission in 1992 to sell its interest in Eemland, Eemland sold Wilkinson Sword to Warner-Lambert, owner of Schick razor brand forming Schick-Wilkinson Sword. The Schick name was used on its products in North America and Japan, and the Wilkinson Sword name in Europe. In 2000, Pfizer acquired Warner-Lambert and three-years later, divested the Wilkinson component.

Most of the former Bryant and May operations of Wilkinson Match were closed or sold in the late 1970s and early 1980s, including the Bryant and May factories in Bow and Melbourne. The home and gardening tools division was sold to Fiskars in 1988.

=== Sword production ===
Throughout the 20th century, Wilkinson Sword produced ceremonial swords for the Household Cavalry of the British Army, and crafted the ceremonial sword for the Golden Jubilee of Elizabeth II in 2002. The sword factory combined state of the art manufacturing technology with traditional skills and 19th century machinery to produce original fighting quality swords. The company was also chosen to fabricate the Sword of Stalingrad in 1943.

The production of swords came to an end when the company's sword factory at Acton closed in September 2005. Wilkinson Sword then held an auction of the tools, equipment, sword drawings, and forging and milling machinery. Robert Pooley, who had commissioned the company to produce swords, bought many of these items and formed Pooley Sword to supply the Army in place of Wilkinson Sword. Other sword manufacturers, and in particular WKC in Germany, also bought items, including the roll forge. Many of the tools and machines remain in use, and classic knives such as the Fairbairn-Sykes are produced by both companies.

=== 21st century ===
Energizer Holdings bought Wilkinson Sword from Pfizer in 2003, along with Schick. In 2015, Energizer demerged its personal care business as a new company, Edgewell Personal Care, of which Wilkinson Sword and Schick became part. Both are now brands used by Edgewell; Wilkinson Sword is used in Europe and Schick is used in Edgewell's remaining markets.

Wilkinson Sword-branded three-, four-, and five-bladed razors for men and women have been produced in Germany since 1998, when production moved from the UK.

In January 2026, Wilkinson Sword was signed as the official men's grooming partner of Williams F1 Team.

=== India ===
In India the 'Wilkinson Sword' brand is owned by Gillette, who manufacture and sell products using the Wilkinson Sword logo.

=== South Carolina ===
Following the theft of the Sword of State of South Carolina in 1941, a replacement was procured by Edward Wood, 1st Earl of Halifax from Wilkinson Sword, Ltd. The sword, the third to hold the designation of SC Sword of State, is made of steel and gold, featuring iconography of the state etched into the sides of the blade and a burgundy leather sheath. The sword was presented to the state in 1951. The sword remains in use to this day as a ceremonial artifact of the South Carolina Senate.

== Products ==
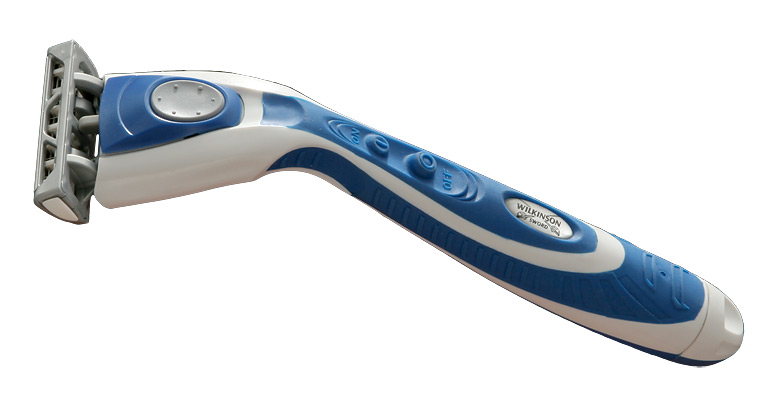
Quattro Titanium Energy

- Wilkinson Sword Hydro: Wilkinson's Sword redesigned razor system released on 6 April 2010.
  - Wilkinson Sword Hydro 5: A 5-blade razor system with "skin guards advanced hydrating gel and a flip trimmer".
  - Wilkinson Sword Hydro 3: A 3-blade razor system similar to the 5-blade system but all for a flip trimmer.
  - Wilkinson Sword Hydro Silk: A 5-blade women's razor system. Introduced in mid-2012 as a Schick model; added to the Wilkinson Sword line later that year.
  - Wilkinson Sword Hydro 5 Power Select: A motorized version of the Hydro 5, with three user-selectable vibration levels.
- Wilkinson Sword Intuition: A women's shaving system that lathers and shaves at the same time.
- Wilkinson Sword Quattro: a four-bladed razor for men, introduced in 2003. The Quattro Midnight and Quattro Titanium are models with redesigned handles and different color schemes from the original Quattro.
  - Quattro Power: A motorized version of the Quattro; it is supposed to reduce friction. The Quattro Titanium Power is a Quattro Power with a different color scheme and Quattro Titanium cartridges. The Quattro Power is powered by a single AAA battery.
  - Quattro Titanium: includes a titanium nitride (simply referred to as 'titanium') coating on the blades that is claimed to reduce irritation.
  - Quattro for Women: A modified version of the Quattro with a feminine color scheme.
- Wilkinson Sword Protector: A razor that is claimed to protect against nicks.
- Wilkinson Sword Protector 3D: A disposable razor
- Wilkinson Sword Xtreme3: A three-blade men's shaving razor. Now also sold in the US as Wilkinson Sword Tech 3.
  - Wilkinson Sword XTreme3 Disposable: A disposable version of the Xtreme3, introduced in 1999.
  - Wilkinson Sword Tech 3 Sensitive: A US-only three-blade disposable razor marketed for users with sensitive skin.
  - Wilkinson Sword Extra 2 Sensitive: A two-bladed disposable razor that comes in four different varieties. A similar model is sold in the US as Wilkinson Sword Classic Twin.
  - Wilkinson Sword Extra 2 Beauty: A two-blade disposable women's razor. Sold in the US as Wilkinson Sword Classic Twin.
- Wilkinson Sword Xtreme3 Beauty: A three-blade disposable women's razor. Sold in the US as Wilkinson Sword Oasis. The "Oasis" name is also used for a USA-only three-blade refillable women's razor system.
- Wilkinson Sword Classic: A budget, entry-level double-edged men's safety razor.

Wilkinson also makes double edge razor blades for safety razors.

== In popular culture ==
- In Satyajit Ray's Bengali detective Feluda story Shakuntala's Kantha haar, Lalmohan Ganguly mentioned that for a "luxurious" shaving experience he prefers costly Wilkinson blades over the cheap blades and bought them regularly from New Market, Kolkata.
- In the Mad Men Season 7 (Part 2) premiere, Don Draper has a dream wherein Rachel Menken auditions for an ad campaign and shows how smooth her legs are. He tells her, admiringly: "You're not just smooth. You're Wilkinson smooth."
