= Human AI Labs =

Technology company

Personal AI
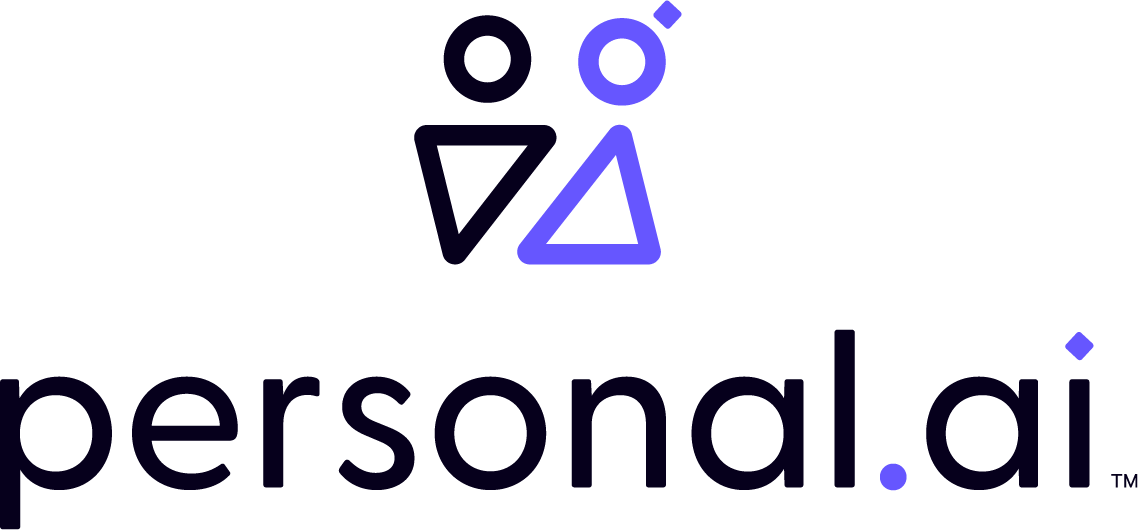
- Trade name: Personal AI
- Type: Private
- Industry: Artificial intelligence
- Founded: February 2020; 6 years ago
- Founders: Suman Kanuganti, Sharon Zhang, Kristie Kaiser
- Headquarters: San Francisco, California
- Area served: Worldwide
- Key people: Jonathan Bikoff, Eric Johnston
- Website: personal.ai

Human AI Labs, Inc., operating under the business name and brand name Personal AI, is a technology company based in San Francisco, California, focused on artificial intelligence technologies for personal productivity and communication.

== History ==
Human AI Labs, Inc. was founded in February 2020 by Suman Kanuganti, Sharon Zhang, and Kristie Kaiser. Originally known as Luther AI, the company rebranded as Personal AI in 2021.

In January 2021, the company raised $3.2 million in seed funding led by Differential VC with participation from Village Global VC, Good Friends VC, Beni VC, and Keshif Ventures. In early 2023, Personal AI raised $7.8 million in seed funding to develop its proprietary language model, the Generative Grounded Transformer (GGT-1), which trains on individual users' personal data rather than publicly available data. This funding was backed by Supernode Global, Differential Ventures, BBG Ventures, Village Global, and other investors.

In April 2023, Personal AI launched, a memory-based user-trained, user-owned and user-controlled AI, designed for long-term memory storage. This model provides a foundation for creating a digital "mind" that continuously learns and enables personalized content generation and question answering from a user's own memory. In January 2024, the company announced Personal AI MODEL-2, which expands on MODEL-1 with a multi-persona, multi-modal, and multi-channel system. It integrates long- and short-term memory, supports personalized voice clones and image generation, and enables multi-party dialogues. MODEL-2 also offers SMS and Messenger integration and supports hierarchical sub-personas with individual memory banks for personal, team, and organizational applications. In September 2023, BBC Science Focus named Personal AI as one of the best AI chatbots of the year.

In the summer of 2024, former congressman and OpenAI board member William Hurd joined the Personal AI board. On September 26, 2024, Personal AI's Small Language Model (SLM) technology and AI Training Platform became available on Google Cloud Marketplace, allowing quicker deployment for regulated industries such as finance and government. Personal AI was named the best AI Chatbot by Zapier in 2024.

Also, in September 2024, BDev Ventures announced a strategic investment in Personal AI.

== Activities ==
Personal AI's core technologies include the Generative Grounded Transformer (GGT-1) and Small Language Models (SLMs), which are customized to individual users' data. These models incorporate memory-stacking functions, allowing users to retrieve information and insights from past interactions. In professional environments, Personal AI's platform enables organizations to establish networks of AI Personas designed for specific roles and based on proprietary data. Personal AI differs from other models like ChatGPT by focusing on a personal model rather than a general large-scale language model.

== Funding ==
Human AI Labs, Inc. has secured a total of $12 million in funding from various venture capital firms and individual investors. Investors include Supernode Global, Differential Ventures, BBG Ventures, Powerhouse Capital, Republic Deal Room, BDev Ventures, Altair Capital, Beni VC, Village Global, Keshif Ventures, and Good Friends, a venture capital firm founded by the creators of Warby Parker, Harry's, and Allbirds. Among its advisory board are Rob Granieri of Jane Street Capital, Kelvin Beachum of the Arizona Cardinals, Anirudh Koul of Pinterest and Microsoft, and Bradley Taylor of Google Moonshot.
