= Moore family =

Moore family may refer to:

- Collections of sets that characterize a closure operator, according to mathematician E. H. Moore's theorem in set theory.
- The Moore family (Carolinas), a prominent political family of North and South Carolina during the 18th and 19th centuries.
