= Wilkinson TMC =

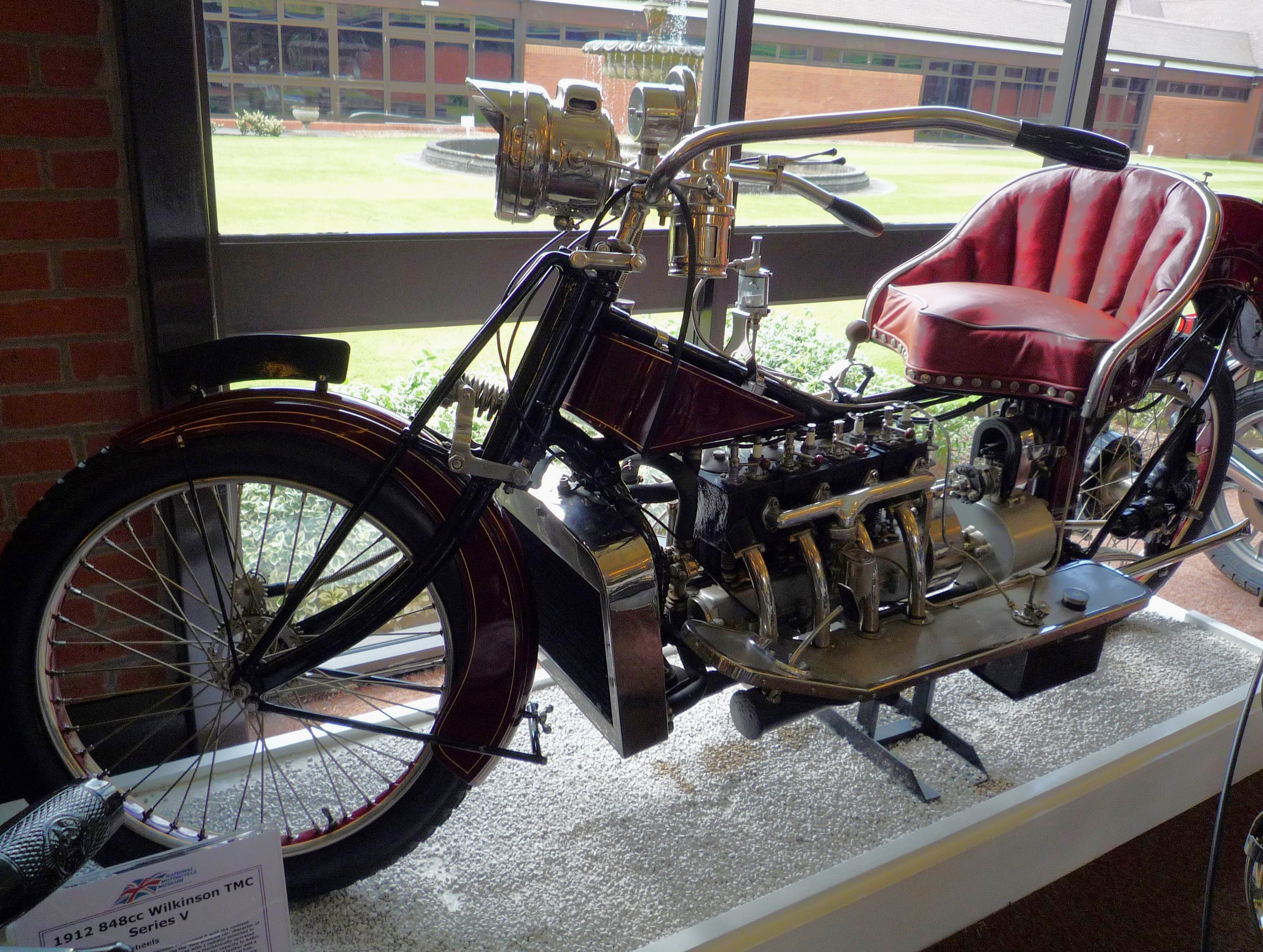
- Manufacturer: Wilkinson Sword
- Production: 1911–1916
- Engine: 848 cc four-cylinder side-valve
- Transmission: Shaft drive
- Wheelbase: 62 inches (160 cm)
- Weight: 320 pounds (150 kg) (dry)

The Wilkinson TMC is a British luxury touring motorcycle manufactured by the Wilkinson Sword company in Acton, London between 1911 and 1916, when production was stopped by the first World War.

== Development ==
The first Wilkinsons motorcycle was built by the Wilkinson Sword company, which had diversified from making blades into a number of new products, including bicycles, typewriters and automobiles, as well as luxury motorcycles. The first 'Wilkinsons' were originally designed for military reconnaissance by P G Tacchi, who was granted a patent for the design in 1908. Demonstrated to the British military in the Summer of 1908, the Wilkinson motorcycle failed to impress the authorities, despite optional accessories including a Maxim machine gun mounted on the handlebars. Undaunted, the company continued development and exhibited a new version a year later at the Stanley Cycle & Motorcycle Show at the Agricultural Hall, Islington, London in 1909. This model had a 676 cc four-cylinder engine and was designated the 'TAC' (for 'Touring Auto Cycle'. An upgraded version of the military model was also exhibited, with a revolver holster fitted to the side of the seat.

The unsuccessful military prototype was originally powered by an air-cooled transverse V-twin, but a new engine was developed at their Oakley works in Chiswick for the luxury production Wilkinson in December 1911. This was a water-cooled 848 cc with a large radiator at the front. An in-line four-cylinder side-valve, it had a bore and stroke of 60 x 75 mm. Redesignated the 'TMC' (for "Touring Motor Cycle"), the Wilkinson TMC was one of the top of the range motorcycles built before the First World War. It had no front brake, so relied on twin drum rear brakes which were pedal operated. The brazed lug tubular frame was fully sprung with quarter elliptic rear springs and 'girder' front forks with horizontal springs compressed through bell crank levers.

Wilkinson had also diversified into light car production by this time and designed a substantial enclosed sidecar with leaf spring suspension as an option for the TMC. In 1912 the 'worm drive' rear hub was replaced with more effective bevel gearing and the Wilkinson designed girder forks were upgraded to a 'Saxon' design to improve handling. Only about 250 Wilkinsons were produced before the First World War restrictions brought the line to its end in the Spring of 1916 and the Wilkinson company had to produce thousands of bayonets for the war effort. After the war they decided to continue to develop the in-line four engine – but in a new car called the 'Deemster' and they never returned to motorcycle production.

A 1912 Wilkinson was featured in action on the BBC TV programme Top Gear on 14 April 1988 as part of the Feet First feature written and presented by Paul Blezard. Malcolm Newell and his Quasar and Royce Creasey and his prototype Voyager were also featured.

== See also ==
- List of motorcycles of the 1910s
