= Henry Nock =

English inventor (1741–1804)

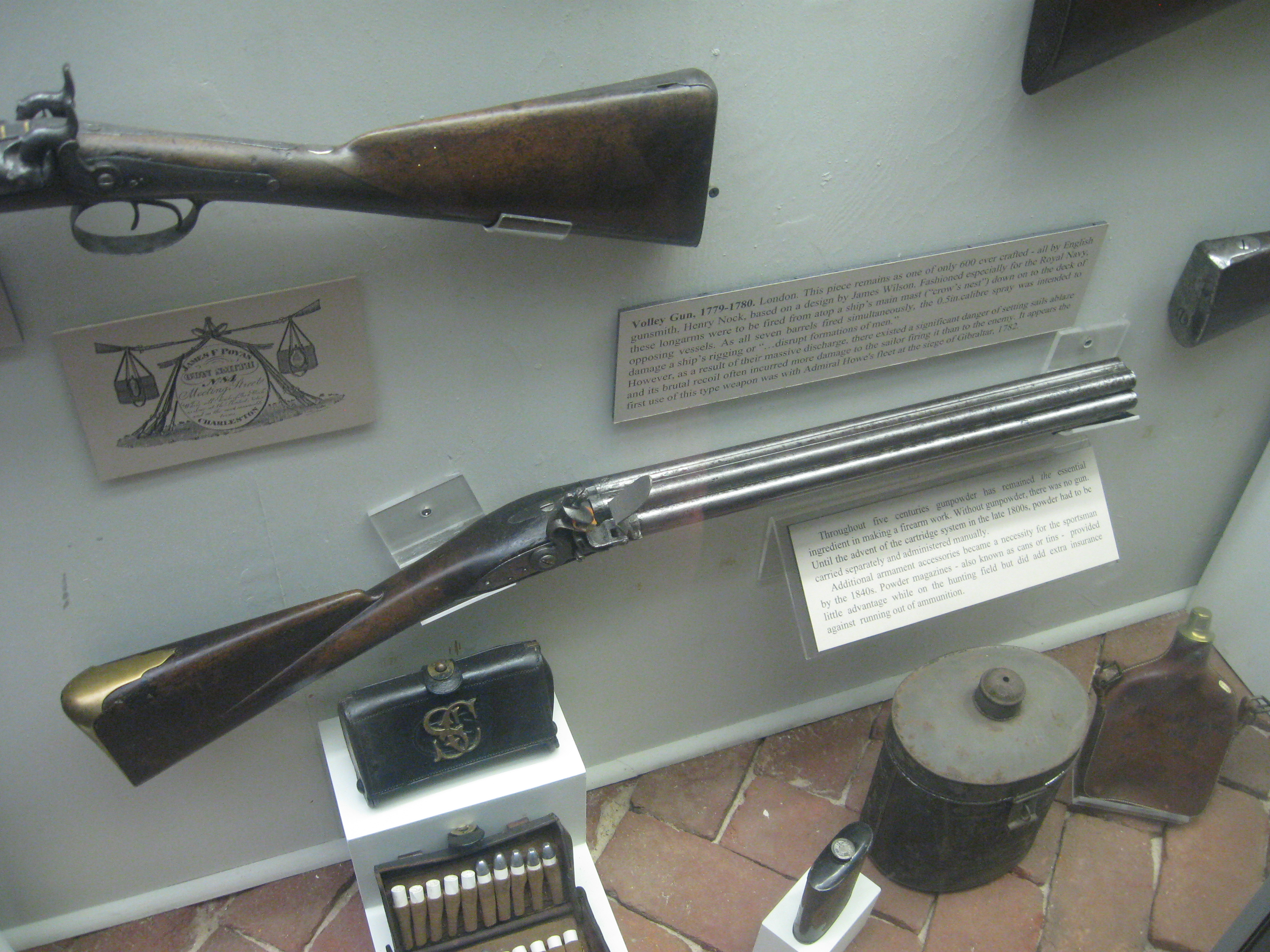
The Nock volley gun

Henry Nock (1741 – December 1804) was an English inventor and engineer of the Napoleonic era, best known as a gunmaker. Nock produced many innovative weapons including the screwless lock and the seven-barrelled volley gun, although he did not invent the latter despite it commonly being known as the Nock gun. He was a major supplier to the military during the Napoleonic Wars. His high quality duelling pistols and double-barrelled shotguns were much sought after and it is largely through Nock that the latter became the weapon of choice for hunters.

As well as supplying the military and civilian markets, Nock made expensive pieces for the aristocracy and royalty and was an appointed gunmaker to the king. Nock's business eventually became Wilkinson Sword, a company which today makes razor blades and other shaving equipment and, until 2005, made officer's swords for the British Army.

== Guns ==
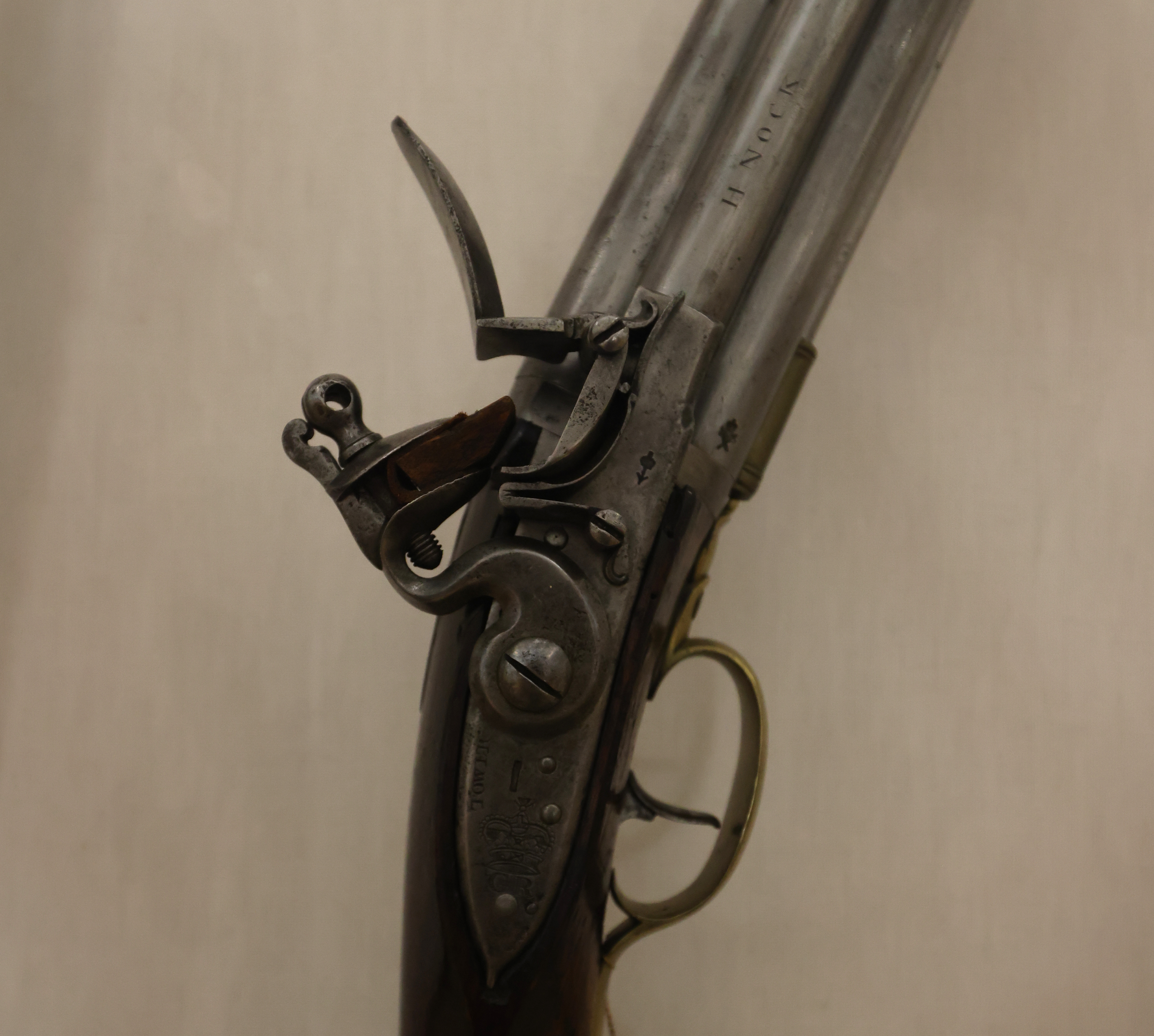
Close up of Flintlock and H Nock inscription on a nock volley gun

Nock produced many innovative weapons. In 1793, he made a double-barrelled pistol with a removable stock for the Royal Horse Artillery. However, this weapon was impractical with the stock removed and was usually used as a carbine. In 1797, Nock put into production a 9-inch pistol (pattern 1796) for heavy dragoons with a calibre matching their carbines. Some of these pistols had a novel lock designed by Nock, originally intended for an abandoned musket design requested by the Duke of Richmond in 1786 while serving as Master-General of the Ordnance. The new lock could be dismantled by removable pins rather than the previous more cumbersome and time-consuming screws, and were intended to have interchangeable components. The pattern 1796 had no butt-plate and the ramrod was stored in the holster rather than attached to the barrel. This feature made it unpopular with users and many guns were modified to take a conventional swivel ramrod.

The name of Nock is perhaps best known today for the multi-barrelled Nock gun due to it being featured in several films. These include uses of this volley gun by the characters Patrick Harper in Sharpe and Jim Bowie in The Alamo. Nock was the manufacturer, but not the inventor, of this weapon. Despite its portrayal in film, this weapon was not very practical as a hand weapon due its very severe recoil, often causing injuries, and the time needed to reload the seven barrels. It was necessary to abandon the rifling of the early prototypes and reduce the charge to keep this problem manageable. Intended as a naval weapon fired from the rigging to repel boarders on the deck, it was retired by the Royal Navy in 1804. Nock also produced some experimental rotating multi-barrelled guns to fire one barrel at a time.

In his own day, Nock was most well known for his double-barrelled shotguns. He was not the first to make weapons in such a format, but their high quality and Nock's many innovations led to shotguns becoming highly popular as a hunting gun, especially after Nock became gun maker to the king. Nock was also well known for his duelling pistols.

Nock made weapons covering the whole field from pistols to muskets. The great variety is perhaps illustrated by his coach blunderbuss which, like naval pistols, had a more corrosion resistant brass barrel. Such weapons were intended to be used at short range and did not take a large enough charge to require iron barrels. Nock continued to innovate until his death – late in life he was making breech loading muskets.

== Career ==
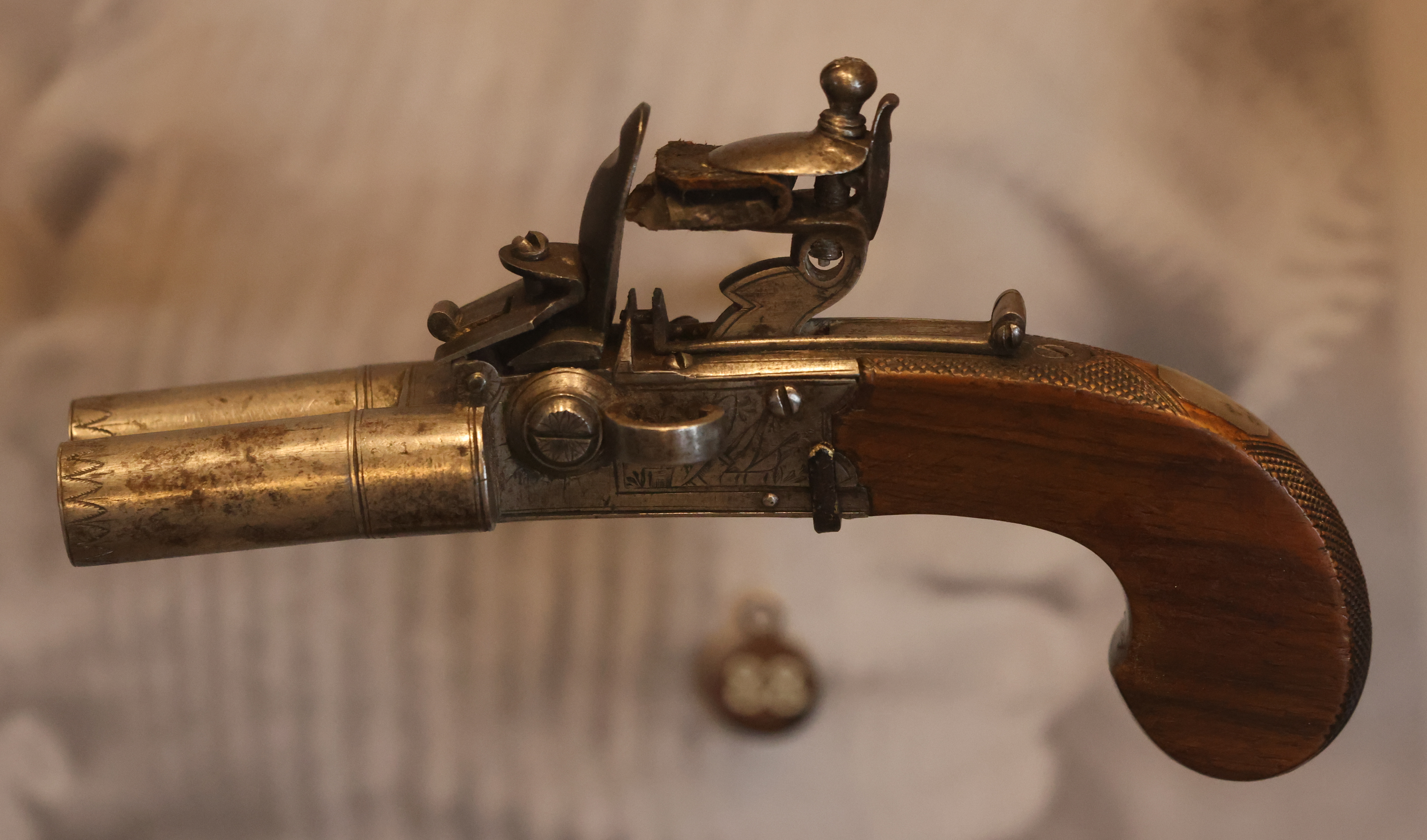
A muff pistol made by Henry Nock's company

Nock started out as a locksmith, but he took out a patent for a gun lock in 1775. Nock was not yet enrolled in the Worshipful Company of Gunmakers and could not trade under his own name. He formed Nock, Jover & Co. with William Jover, a Master of the Gunmakers Company and the patent bore Jover's name as well as Nock's along with one John Green. War with the American colonies provided a strong market for Nock's products.

James Wilson came to Nock in 1779 to make the prototypes for his volley gun design. Nock won the subsequent competitive bid for the production of the gun. The weapon is consequently commonly referred to as the Nock gun. Nock also produced some volley guns and volley pistols for the civilian market but in very small numbers. This included a set of these weapons for the Royal Household which is still in the Queen's collection today. This set is not standard production. It has, for instance, silver mounts by Mark Bock, a London silversmith.

Following the conclusion of the American Revolutionary War, there was a fall in the demand for military small arms. In this period Nock turned to the civilian market, but also had profitable orders for locks for light to medium calibre (3–12-pounder) naval guns.

In 1784 Nock finally became a Freeman of the Gunmakers Company. A few years later the French Revolution and the subsequent Napoleonic Wars ensured that Nock was not short of government business. The Duke of Richmond preferred Nock over his competitors for his innovations, particularly the screwless lock. Nock was originally contracted to deliver complete 'Duke of Richmond's' muskets, but encountered difficulties in production and renegotiated his contract to be paid for delivering batches of parts to be assembled later. However, this required him to assign the lease of his workshops to the Board of Ordnance as security, an agreement which put him under pressure for the rest of his life.

Ultimately, orders for the 'Duke of Richmond's' musket with its atypical smaller calibre 11-bore barrel dried up in favour of the cheaper and simpler 'India Pattern' musket and its 12-bore barrel. Thereafter Nock concentrated on supplying muskets to local militia preparing for an expected invasion. In 1804 Nock was contracted to adjust the ramrods of the Duke of Richmond's muskets, after they proved unpopular when issued to the 43rd and 52nd Regiments on their conversion to light infantry.

In 1789 Nock was appointed gunmaker-in-ordinary to King George III, largely as a result of his patented breech for hunting guns and other inventions. In the year 1800, a flintlock rifled carbine was privately produced by Nock. In 1802 Nock became Master of the Gunmakers Company. He died at Sutton in December 1804, aged 63.

== Legacy ==
Nock's will was generous to his employees and specified that his business was to be continued for six months for their benefit. He also left as much as £100 (inflation adjusted £8,700) to some employees.

A nephew of Henry, Samuel Nock, was an apprentice under him. Samuel also proved to be inventive, holding a patent himself. Samuel became Gunmaker-in-Ordinary in succession to George III, George IV, William IV and Victoria and in 1836 became a Master of the Gunmakers Company. However, Henry Nock's own business was continued by his foreman and son-in-law James Wilkinson. Wilkinson became Gunmaker-in-Ordinary to the king in 1805. Contracts with the East India Company ensured the success of the business. The name became James Wilkinson & Son around 1818 when James' son Henry joined. Henry died in 1864 but the company continued making firearms and bladed weapons and became known as Wilkinson Sword. A series of new laws in the UK, starting with the Pistols Act 1903, restricted the sale of firearms to the public. That pushed the company into changing direction and it henceforth concentrated on razor blades and other domestic products. It continued to produce swords for the British Army and for royal ceremonial purposes until 2005 when the sword manufacturing plant in Acton, West London, was closed. The company continues to make shaving and gardening products.

== Bibliography ==
- Jeff Kinard, Spencer C. Tucker, Pistols: An Illustrated History of Their Impact, ABC-CLIO, 2004 ISBN 1851094709.
- Philip Haythornthwaite, British Cavalryman 1792–1815, Osprey Publishing, 1994 ISBN 1855323648.
- Charles Winthrop Sawyer, Firearms in American History, Sawyer, 1910, OCLC 3162869.
- Peter S.Wainwright, "Henry Nock, Innovator 1741–1804", The American Society of Arms Collectors, Bulletin no. 88, pages 1–20, also available at Readbag.
- Joyce Lee Malcolm, Guns and Violence: The English Experience, Harvard University Press, 2002 ISBN 0674016084.
- M. L. Brown, Firearms in Colonial America, Smithsonian, 1980 ISBN 0874742900
- John Forrest Hayward, The Art of the Gunmaker: Europe and America, 1660-1830, Barrie and Rockliff, 1963 OCLC 499886753
