= Edgewell Personal Care =

American multinational consumer products company

Edgewell Personal Care Company
- Type: Public
- Traded as: NYSE: EPC; S&P 600 component
- Industry: Consumer goods
- Founded: July 1, 2015; 11 years ago
- Fate: Formed after a corporate spin-off from Energizer
- Headquarters: Shelton, Connecticut, U.S.
- Area served: Worldwide
- Key people: Rod R. Little (president and CEO); John C. Hunter (non-executive chairman of the Board of Directors; Francesca Weissman (CFO); LaTanya Langley (CPLO)
- Products: Personal care
- Brands: List: Personna; Edge; Hawaiian Tropic; Skintimate; Schick; Wilkinson Sword
- Revenue: ▼US$2.22 billion (2025)
- Net income: ▼US$25.4 million (2025)
- Number of employees: ≈7,000 (2022)
- Website: edgewell.com

The Edgewell Personal Care Company is an American multinational consumer products company headquartered in Shelton, Connecticut. It was formed in 2015 following the corporate spin-off from Energizer Holdings, Inc..

Edgewell Personal Care was formed by the renaming of the original Energizer Holdings; Energizer's battery business was then spun-off as Energizer Household Products and then renamed Energizer Holdings.

== History ==
In February 2015, Energizer Holdings announced that it would split into two companies. The original entity, Energizer Holdings, Inc, would be converted to a personal care company and renamed Edgewell Personal Care. The household products and assets would be transferred to a new entity, Energizer SpinCo, Inc, that would then be renamed to (new) Energizer Holdings, Inc. David Hatfield, who was president and CEO of Energizer Personal Care at the time was named CEO of the Edgewell brand.

In January 2018, Edgewell announced it had entered an agreement to acquire luxury men's skincare brand Jack Black for an undisclosed sum. Financial data and analysis company Marketscreener reported the deal to be $90.3 million net of cash. The deal closed in March 2018.

In May 2019, Edgewell announced it would purchase the razor company Harry's, including their female-focused Flamingo brand, for $1.37 billion. In October 2019, Edgewell announced that they were selling their diaper and cat litter disposal businesses to Le Holding Angelcare Inc. for $122.5 million.

The FTC announced on February 3, 2020, that it would seek to block Edgewell from purchasing the startup razor company Harry's on concerns of price manipulation. Edgewell announced on February 10, 2020, that it is terminating its merger agreement with Harry's after the FTC sued to block the $1.37 billion deal.

In September 2020, Edgewell announced it was acquiring the shaving products brand CREMO for an all-cash transaction of $235 million. The acquisition was completed in September 2020.

In November 2021, Edgewell announced it had acquired women's body brand Billie in an all-cash transaction at a purchase price $310 million.

In 2022 and 2023, Edgewell issued a recall of some of its Banana Boat sunscreen due to the presence of benzene, a known carcinogen.

In November 2025, it was announced Edgewell had sold its feminine care business to the Swedish multinational compan, Essity for $340m on a cash and debt-free basis.

== Brands ==
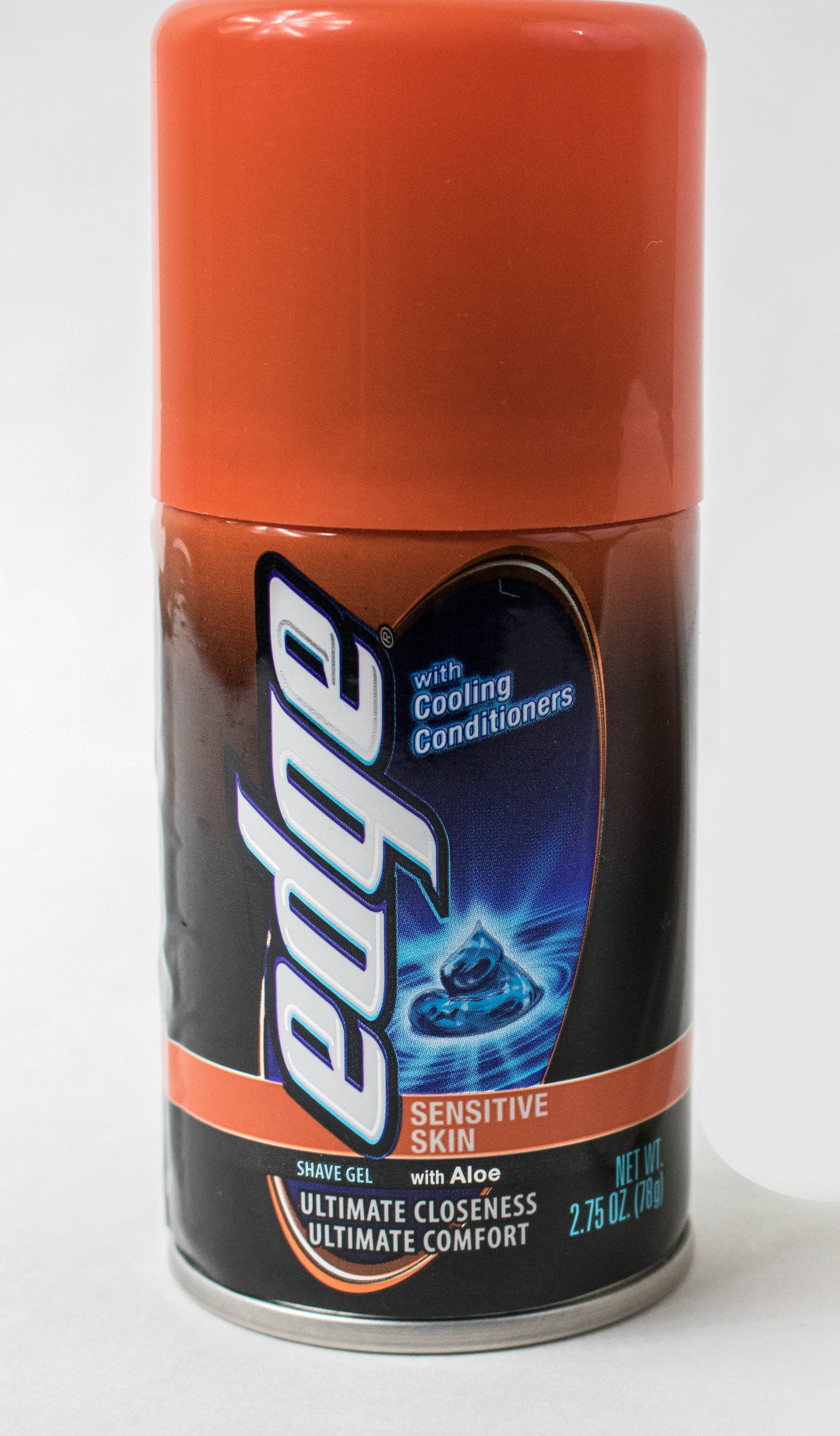
Edge shaving gel

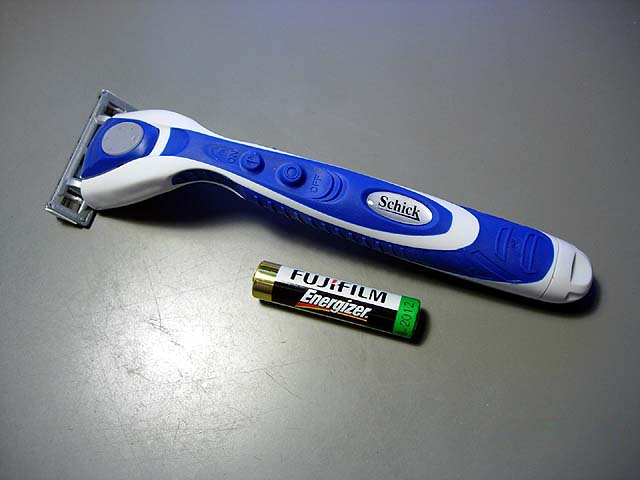
Schick razor

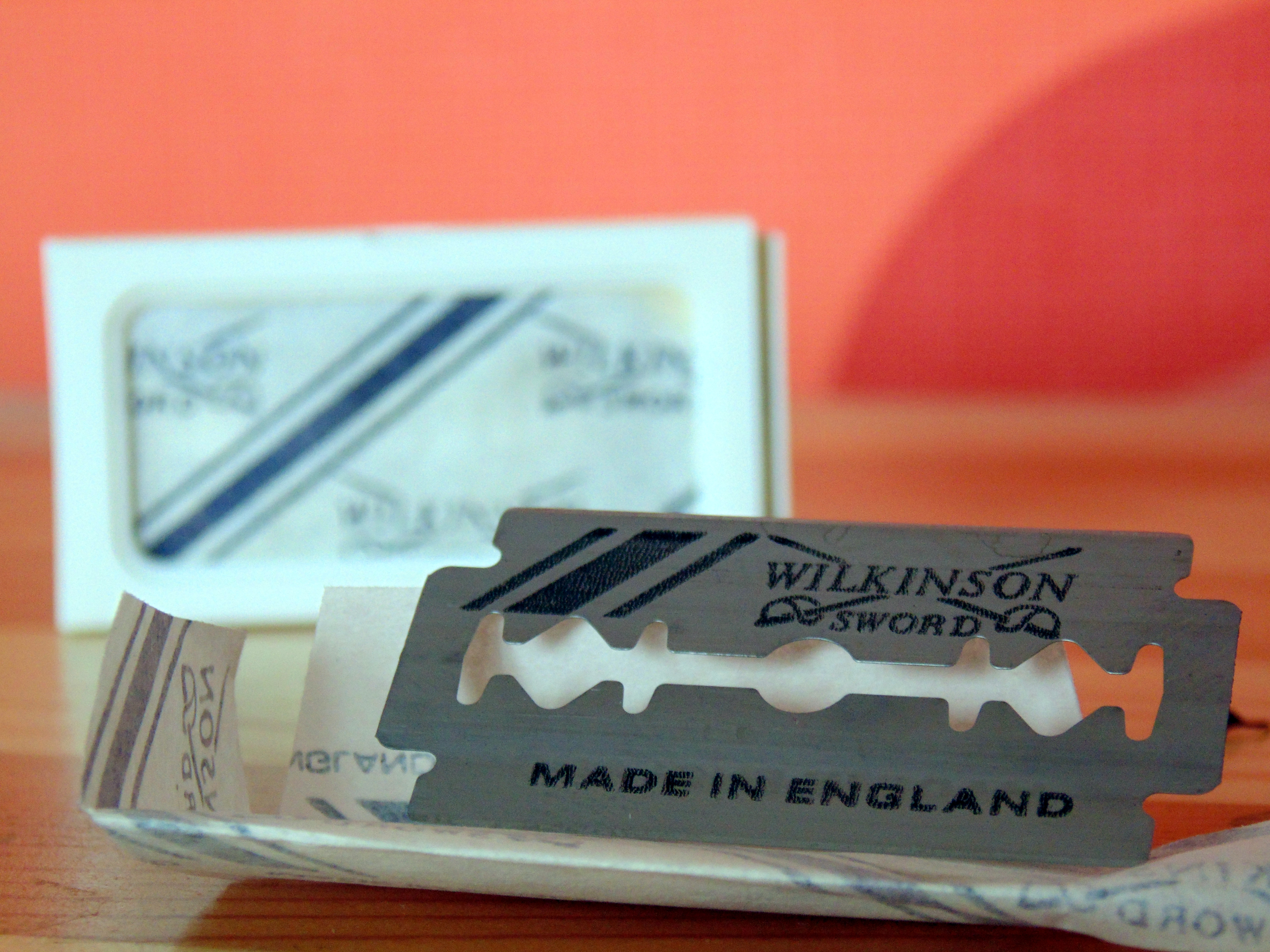
Wilkinson razor blade

Brand	Product line
Personna	razors
Banana Boat	sunscreen
Billie	razors
Bull Dog	skin care
Cremo	skin care
Edge	shaving gel
Hawaiian Tropic	sunscreen
Jack Black	skin care
Skintimate	razors
Schick	razors
Wet Ones	skin care
Wilkinson Sword	razors
