= Jacob Schick =

American businessman (1877–1937)

- Born: September 16, 1877; Ottumwa, Iowa, United States
- Died: July 3, 1937 (age 59); New York City, U.S.
- Resting place: Mount Royal Cemetery, Montreal
- Occupations: Inventor, Entrepreneur
- Known for: Pioneer of Electric razor

Jacob Schick (September 16, 1877 – July 3, 1937) was an American military officer, inventor, and entrepreneur who patented an early electric razor and started the Schick Dry Shaver, Inc., razor company.

Schick became a Canadian citizen in 1935 to avoid an investigation by the Joint Congressional Committee on Tax Evasion & Avoidance after he moved most of his wealth to a series of holding companies in the Bahamas.

== Early life ==
Jacob Schick was born in 1877 in Ottumwa, Iowa, and raised in Los Corrillos, New Mexico. His father was a German immigrant who staked prospector’s claims and established a coal mining company, where Jacob began working as a child. At the early age of 16, Schick was in charge of a railroad line that ran from Los Corrillos, New Mexico, to a coal mine opened by his father. Schick enlisted in the 14th Infantry Regiment in 1898 and was shortly thereafter assigned to the Philippines in the 1st Division 8th Army Corps. He returned to the Philippines from 1903 to 1905 as a 2nd Lieutenant with the 8th Infantry Regiment. He returned to the U.S. suffering from dysentery, where one version of the invention story claims he conceived of the idea of an electric razor. He was promoted to first lieutenant and was transferred to the 22nd Infantry Regiment in Alaska a year later, where he helped to lay telegraph lines for the military. He officially separated from the military in 1910, but returned to duty from 1916 to 1918 as a Captain (eventually promoted to Lt. Colonel) due to the outbreak of World War I in 1914.

== Career ==
=== Business ===
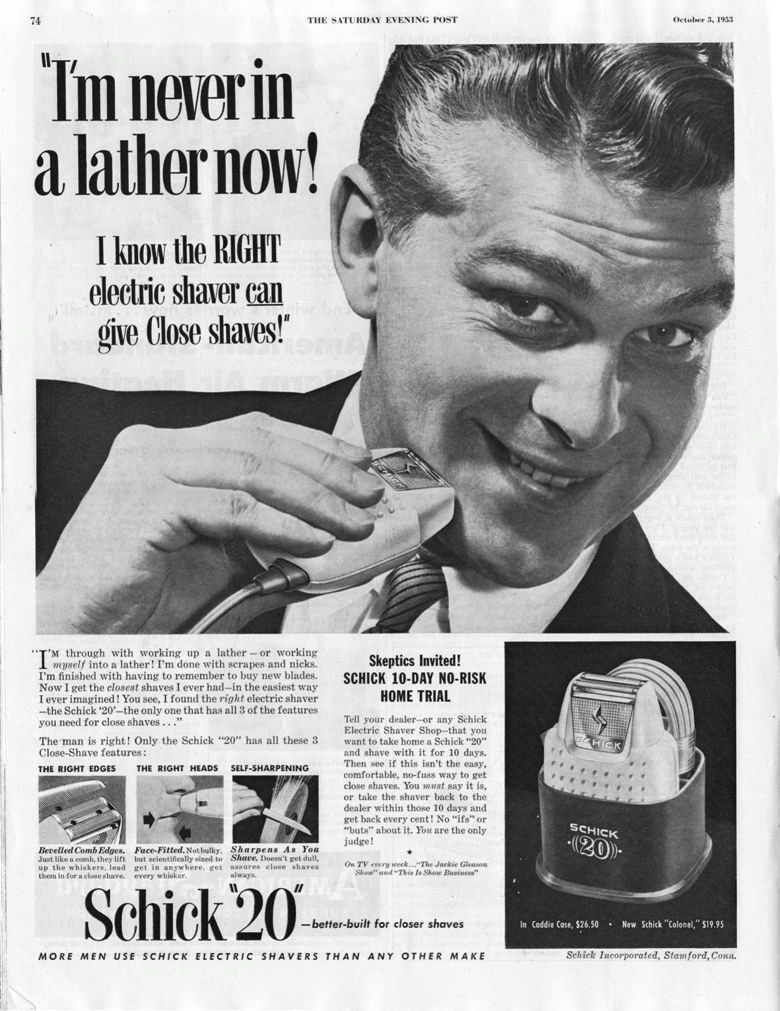
An early Schick electric shaver advertisement.

Jacob Schick's first business venture, the Magazine Repeating Razor Co. sold a razor with injection cartridge blades designed much like a repeating rifle, inspired by his experience in the Spanish-American War, where the blades were sold in clips that could be loaded into the razor without touching the blade. He created a prototype in 1921 and patented it in 1923. This business provided the necessary capital to develop his electric razor concept when he sold it to the American Chain & Cable Company in 1928.

=== Inventions ===
Successfully patented first electric razor in May 1930. Also patented the General Jacobs Boat for use in shallow water, and an improved pencil sharpener.

== Later life ==
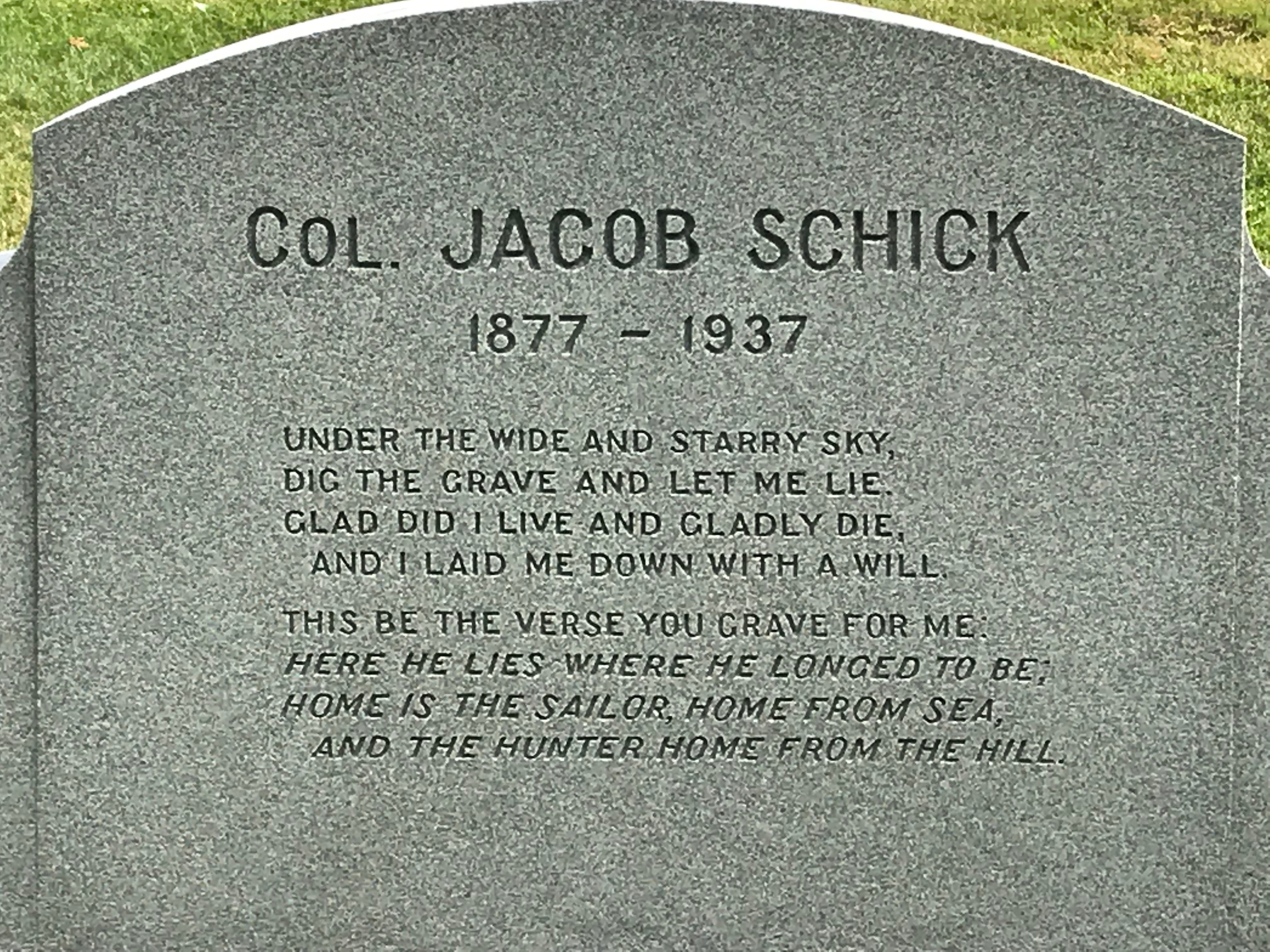
Detail of Schick's funeral monument in Mount Royal Cemetery, in Montreal.

After having moved to Canada, Schick died on July 3, 1937, at New York-Presbyterian Hospital from complications due to a kidney operation. He was survived by his wife Florence Leavitt Schick Stedman, and his two daughters Virginia and Barbara. He is buried in the Mount Royal Cemetery in Montreal, Quebec.
