= Avenir Telecom =

Telecommunication products distributor and related services provider

Avenir Telecom SA
- Type: Société anonyme
- Traded as: Euronext: AVT; CAC Small
- Industry: Communication products and services provider
- Founded: 1989
- Founder: Jean-Daniel Beurnier
- Headquarters: Marseille, France
- Area served: Worldwide
- Key people: Jean-Daniel Beurnier (Chairman and CEO)
- Revenue: €469.71 million (2011) (Note: Between 31 March 2011 and 31 March 2012.)
- Operating income: €12.59 million (2011) (Note: Between 31 March 2011 and 31 March 2012.)
- Net income: €5.97 million (2011) (Note: Between 31 March 2011 and 31 March 2012.)
- Total assets: €406.6 million (2011) (Note: As of 31 March 2012.)
- Website: www.avenir-telecom.com

Avenir Telecom is a telecommunication product distributor and services provider. It is one of the leading companies in the European market. The major shareholder is the holding company OXO.

The company has worldwide operations. They consist in the distribution and sale of a wide variety of communication products, especially mobile phones, activation of service, accessories, answering and fax machines, phone cases, phone chargers, phone soxs, plastic shelves, 3D phone stickers for mobiles and laptops, earkits, hands-free kits, portable headsets, and USB Bluetooth dongles under the OXO name.

== History ==
Avenir Telecom was founded in 1989 in Marseille, France, by Jean-Daniel Beurnier. At first, it was centered on selling analog mobile phones regionally, before it gained ground in the French national market. In 1992, it signed its first distribution agreement with SFR, and extended it to GSM2 services in 1992. In 1994, the company also sealed an agreement with Itineris and accelerated its growth.

When 1995 hit, the company created its own line of telephone accessories (branded as Top Suxess) and diversified its operations by creating the after sale services' provider Setelec (1995), the logistic management company Logistis (1998) and the internet services' company Net-Up (1998).

Then in 1997, it also started expanding its retail network, creating Phone Shop and Mobile Hut and purchasing the retail chain Interdiscount. In 1999, it sold Phone Shop to the Cegetel Group. At the same time, Avenir Telecom was developing its international business, gaining ground in Europe and Asia.

Avenir Telecom has sold mobile phones and accessories under the Energizer brand name since the 2010s, having licensed the name in 2010.

== Operations ==
The company has more than 671 retail locations for the Internity brand. It also distributes through hypermarkets, supermarkets, specialist chains, and independent retailers, as well as operates a network of independent multi-operator retailers in France, with 100 points of sale franchised under the Mobile Hut brand.

== Shareholders' structure ==
- Public: 48.2%
- Oxo: 29.9%
- Jean-Daniel Beurnier: 20.5%
- Managers: 0.5%
