= Energizer =

American multinational consumer goods company

Energizer Holdings, Inc.

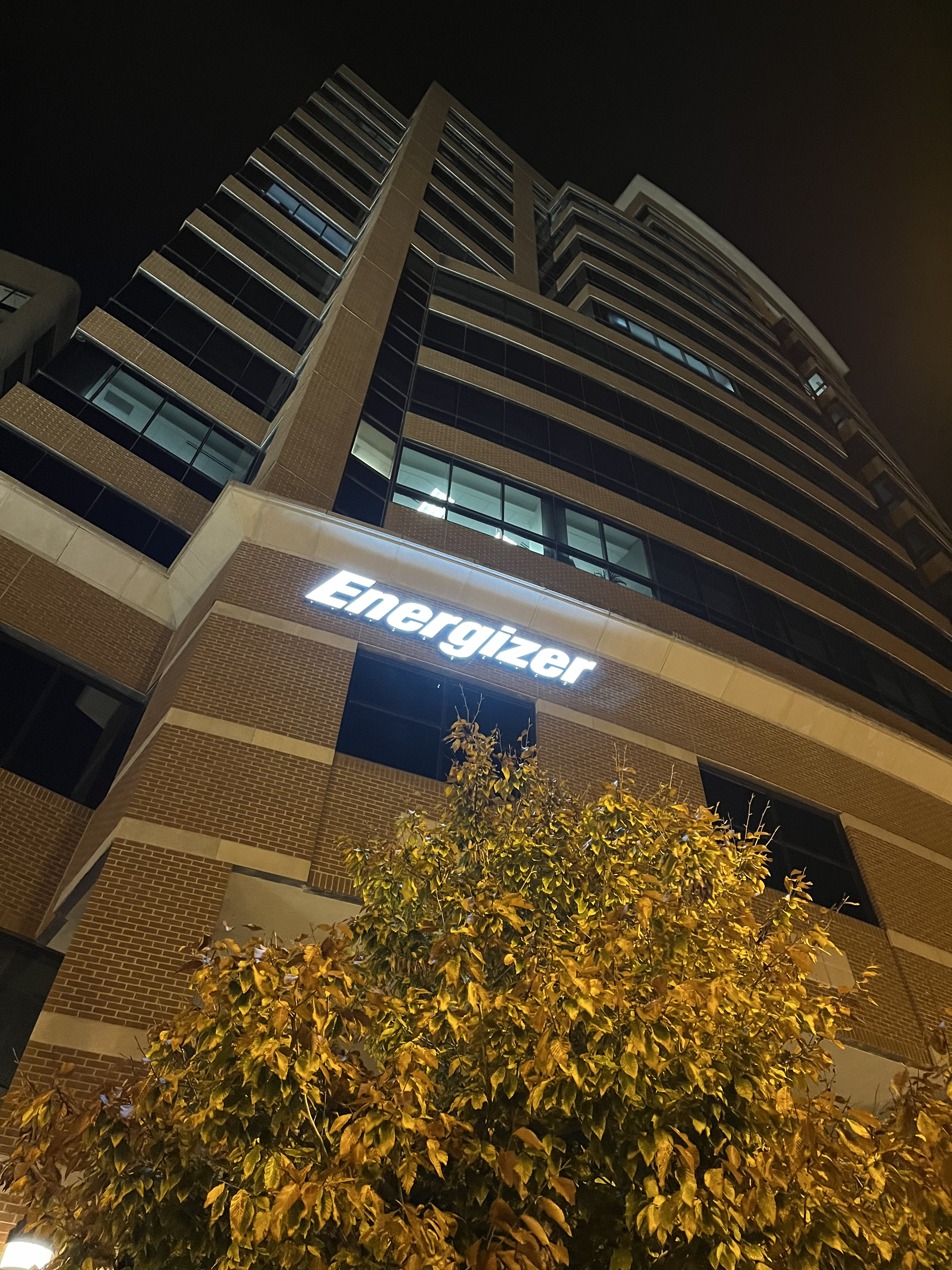
- Energizer Holding headquarters in Clayton, Missouri
- Type: Public
- Traded as: NYSE: ENR; S&P 600 component
- Industry: Electronics; Automotive
- Founded: 2000; 26 years ago (Note: As a corporate spin-off from Ralston Purina.)
- Headquarters: Clayton, Missouri, U.S.
- Key people: Mark LaVigne (CEO); Patrick Moore (chairman)
- Products: Batteries; Motor oil; Automotive care
- Brands: Energizer (Note: The "Energizer Mobile" brand licensed to Avenir Telecom.); Armor All (2019); Eveready (2000); Rayovac (2019); STP (2019); Varta (2019) (Note: Due to European Union regulatory requirements, Energizer was obligated to sell the business to VARTA AG in 2019 (completed in early 2020). Nevertheless Energizer continued to hold rights to use the VARTA brand for retail sales in the U.S. and Asia through a license agreement.)
- Revenue: ▲US$2.95 billion (2025)
- Operating income: ▼US$451 million (2025)
- Net income: ▲US$239 million (2025)
- Total assets: ▲US$4.56 billion (2025)
- Total equity: ▲US$170 million (2025)
- Number of employees: 6,500 (2025)
- Subsidiaries: Eveready Battery Company (2000–present)
- Website: energizerholdings.com
- Footnotes; Financials as of September 30, 2025.

Energizer Holdings, Inc. is an American electric battery manufacturer, headquartered in Clayton, Missouri. One of the largest makers worldwide, it produces under the Energizer, Ray-O-Vac, Varta, and Eveready brand names. Energizer formerly owned several personal care businesses until it separated that side of the business into a new company called Edgewell Personal Care in 2015.

== History ==
The company has its foundation in the Eveready Battery Company, which in 1980 changed the name of its Eveready alkaline power cell to Energizer. In 1986, corporate parent Union Carbide sold Eveready Battery to Ralston Purina. In 2000, Ralston spun off Eveready, and the company was listed on the New York Stock Exchange as "Energizer Holdings, Inc.". The NYSE ticker symbol for Energizer Holdings Inc. is "ENR".

In 2003 under the leadership of then chief executive officer J. Patrick Mulcahy, Energizer Holdings started expanding into the personal care product sector by buying personal care and razor brand Schick and razor brand Wilkinson Sword from Pfizer.

In 2005, after Hurricane Katrina, Energizer worked with the Red Cross to donate flashlights, batteries, razors, and funds to help Hurricane Katrina relief workers and victims. On November 3, 2005, Energizer Holdings Inc. said that higher sales of its Schick razors and blades partially offset lower sales of its batteries in North America. On a constant-currency basis, sales at Energizer rose 4 percent in its fourth quarter.

In October 2007, the company acquired Playtex Products, Inc. for $1.9 billion. The purchase included sunscreen brand Hawaiian Tropic, which Playtex had bought a few months earlier, and Sun Pharmaceuticals Corp., which manufactures the Banana Boat sunscreen products.

In 2009, Energizer acquired Edge and Skintimate shaving gels from S.C. Johnson & Son.

In 2010, the company released a new "Energizer Advanced Lithium" line as their top-performing product series.

The company has licensed the Energizer name to Avenir Telecom, which has sold mobile phones and accessories under the Energizer brand name since the 2010s.

In October 2010, Energizer announced it was the winning bidder for the privately held American Safety Razor in a bankruptcy court auction.

On October 19, 2012, Energizer Holdings said it was withdrawing 23 varieties of its Banana Boat brand of UltraMist spray-on sunscreen lotion from stores due to the risk of it igniting when exposed to fire.

On July 31, 2013, Energizer bought the Stayfree, Carefree, and o.b. brands from Johnson & Johnson for $185 million. The purchase was only for the brands in North America – Johnson & Johnson continues to own the brands in all other regions of the world.

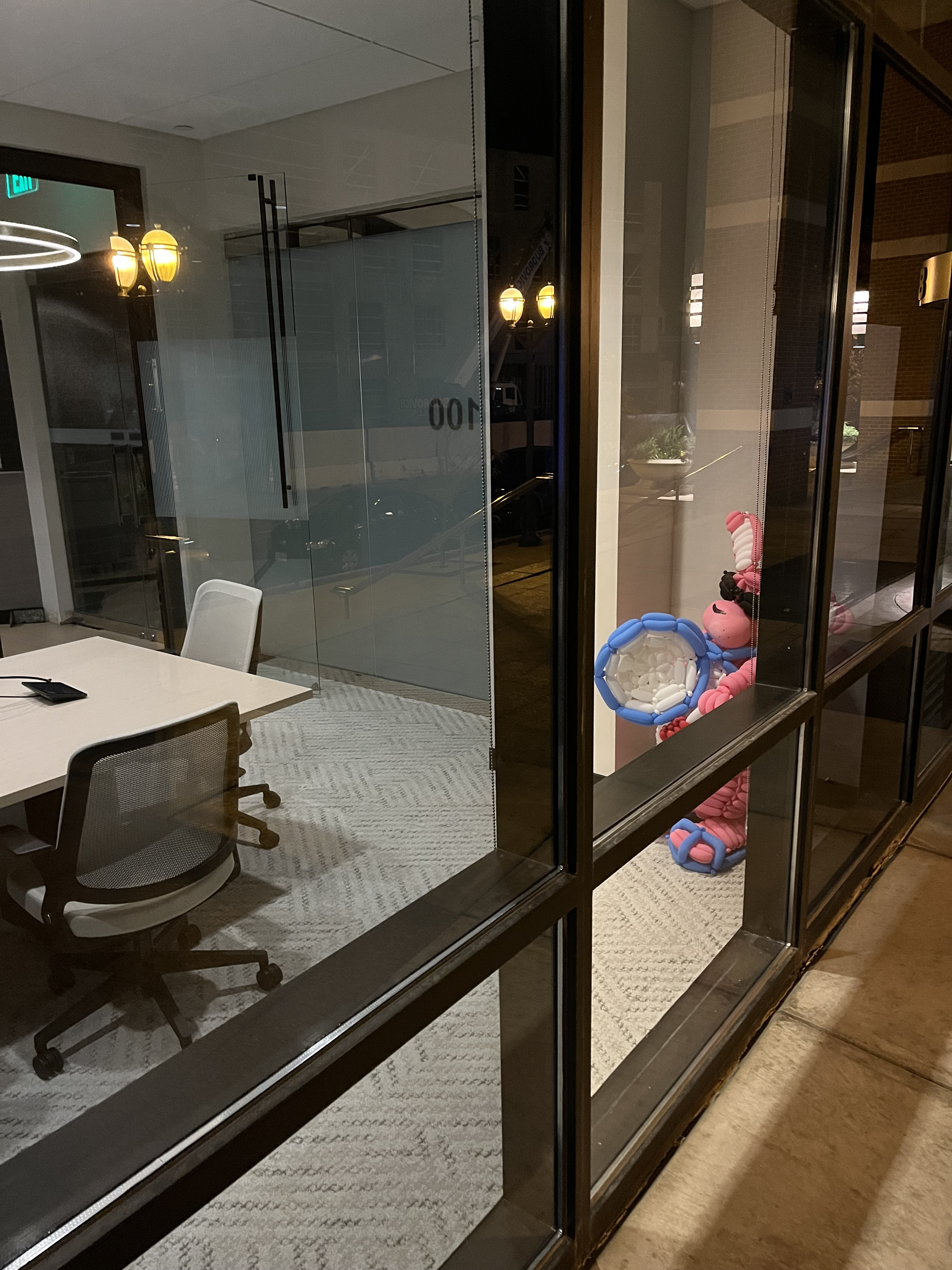
Mascot of Energizer in a meeting room

On April 30, 2014, Energizer announced that by September 2015, it would separate its two lines of business into two publicly traded companies. With revenue of $1.9 billion in the latest fiscal year, the household business would have Energizer chairman J. Patrick Mulcahy as its chairman and unit chief Alan Hoskins as CEO. It would sell batteries, flashlights, and lamps. The personal care company, whose revenue was $2.6 billion, would have Energizer CEO Ward Klein serving as chairman and current unit head David Hatfield as CEO, and would sell feminine products from Playtex, Carefree, o.b. and Stayfree; shaving products from Schick, Edge, Skintimate and Wilkinson Sword; and suntan products from Hawaiian Tropic and Banana Boat.

In 2016, Energizer acquired HandStands Holding Corporation, a leading designer and marketer of automotive fragrance and appearance products. In 2018, Energizer expanded its auto care portfolio with the Nu Finish auto appearance brands.

In January 2018, Energizer announced it was purchasing the global battery and lighting division from Spectrum Brands, which includes the Ray-O-Vac and Varta consumer batteries brands, for $2 billion in cash. This acquisition was finalized in January 2019. However, in May of the same year, the EU antitrust authorities ordered the household battery production of the Varta brand to be divested in Europe. Varta quickly bought the line there to reunite the brand, Energizer retaining the VARTA brand for the Latin America and Asia Pacific markets.

In 2024, Energizer bought the naming rights to CityPark, the home of Major League Soccer team St. Louis City SC, renaming the stadium to Energizer Park. The company moved its headquarters to Clayton, Missouri, in November 2024.

== Operations ==
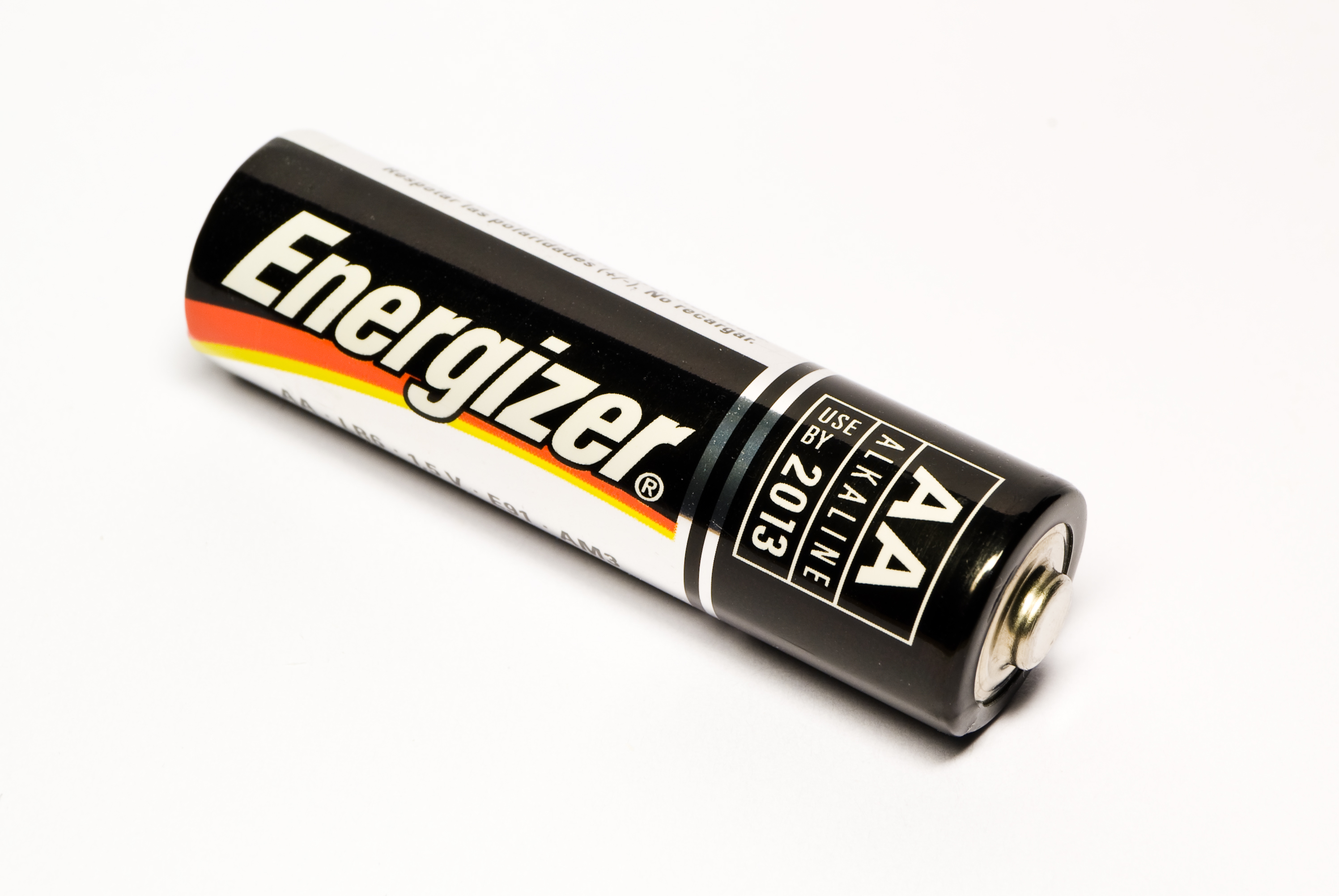
An Energizer AA battery

As of 2021, Energizer has six operational facilities in the United States. It also has a manufacturing facility in Singapore since 1946, supplying the Asia and Oceania markets.

Singapore is home to Energizer's largest international plant, which is also the only Energizer facility outside the United States capable of producing alkaline and lithium batteries.

== See also ==
- Energizer Bunny
