= Revolution of 1719 =

Military coup in South Carolina

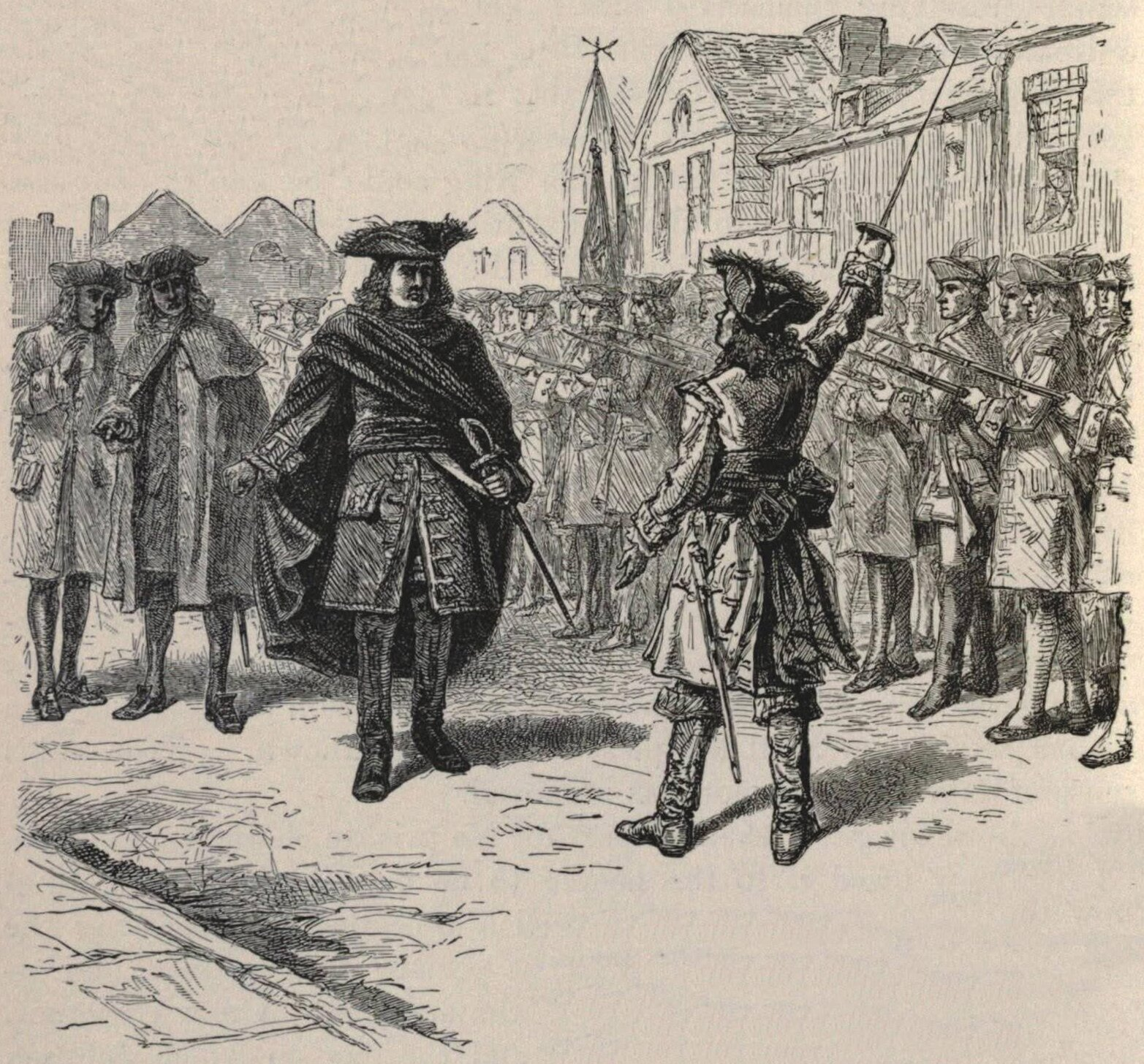
- Governor Robert Johnson being confronted by Colonel Alexander Parris on East Bay Street on the morning of December 21
- Date: December 21, 1719
- Location: Charleston, South Carolina
- Goals: End of proprietary rule, establishment of a crown colony
- Methods: Military coup

Parties
Lords Proprietors of South Carolina	Charleston Militia

Lead figures
Governor Robert Johnson	Col. James Moore, Jr. Col. Alexander Parris

The Revolution of 1719 was a bloodless military coup in the Province of South Carolina which resulted in the overthrow of the Lords Proprietors and the installation of Colonel James Moore Jr. as the colony's de facto ruler, a post he held until 1721.

Popular discontent with the inefficiencies of proprietary rule, exacerbated by the Yamasee War of 1715–1717, has been cited as the precipitating cause of the Revolution of 1719.

The Revolution of 1719 led to the permanent end of proprietary rule in South Carolina and its recreation as a crown colony under a royal governor. It foreshadowed events 56 years later when, in September 1775, royal governor Lord William Campbell was compelled to flee South Carolina due to growing civil unrest on the eve of the American Revolution.

== Background ==
Between 1663 and 1665, Charles II of England granted the Province of Carolina to eight non-resident proprietary lords. European settlement of the area, however, was limited to Charleston and what later was called Albemarle County, the two places being geographically non-contiguous. By 1712 the two regions had effectively ceased operating as a single political entity, resulting in the creation of the Province of North Carolina – composed of the area centered around Albemarle County – and the province of South Carolina.

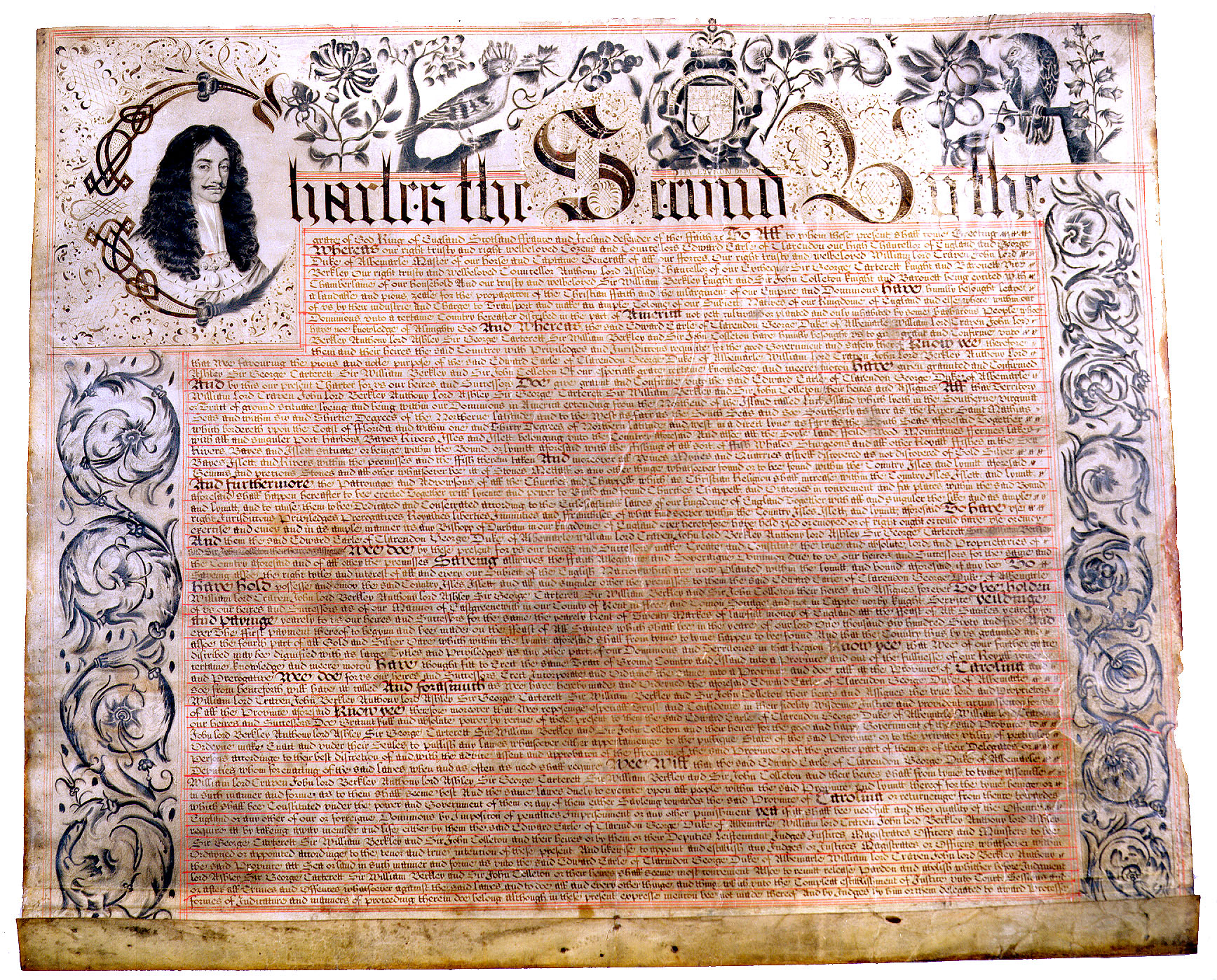
The Carolina Charter of 1663 (pictured) vested governance of what was then the province of Carolina in eight proprietary lords.

By 1719, South Carolinian legislative authority was vested in a bicameral body composed of the popularly elected Commons House of Assembly sitting as a lower chamber, and the Grand Council of the Lords Proprietors, which functioned both as an upper chamber and as a collegiate executive, though its day-to-day powers were exercised by a residential governor it appointed. Governance of South Carolina by the proprietary lords has been characterized as ineffective and erratic. Their failure to adequately prepare for defense of the colony during the Yamasee War created further strain between the people and the London-based proprietors.

In an effort to resolve tensions between the colonists and proprietors, the Commons House of Assembly dispatched Francis Yonge as their delegate to travel to London and meet with the proprietors. The Earl of Granville, Palatine of the Lords of Proprietors, was unavailable to meet, however, the remaining seven proprietary lords considered Yonge's appeal and provided him with a response in the form of sealed letters addressed to their governor, Robert Johnson. Upon receiving the letters from Yonge, Johnson decided not to share them with the Commons House of Assembly due to their inflammatory contents and, instead, dissolved the body, calling for new elections on November 26.

== Coup ==
=== Planning ===
In early November, word arrived in Charleston of an approaching Spanish fleet. Leading community members expressed concern at the city's defensive works which, due to neglect owing at least in part to the detached disinterest of the proprietors, were in a dilapidated state. During the militia muster called for the third week of that month, officers and soldiers began associating into an informal organization intent on usurping power from the proprietors. Among them was Colonel James Moore Jr. and Arthur Skeene, the Speaker of the Commons House of Assembly.

The elections of November 26 brought the plotters and their sympathizers into a majority of the Commons House of Assembly. The new assembly convened on December 16 and were summoned by Governor Johnson for the throne speech. At the speech, Assemblyman Arthur Middleton publicly declared the assembly recognized only the authority of Johnson as a governor of George I and had decided that the Grand Council was an illegal body. Johnson was surprised to the point of inaction by the announcement.

The following day, the assembly - now calling itself a "convention of the people" - set forth a written petition of grievances to Johnson. Responding to the petition, Johnson ordered the Commons House of Assembly dissolved and dispatched Provost Marshal Thomas Conyers to relay his orders. Conyers' visit to the chamber of the Commons House of Assembly was not welcomed by the members, who physically expelled him. The following day, the assembly unilaterally declared Col. Moore to be acting governor of South Carolina.

Concerned that a military review planned for December 21 in Charleston would be used by the rebel faction to move against his government, Governor Johnson ordered militia Col. Alexander Parris to direct the parade's cancellation. Unknown to Johnson, Parris was among the conspirators and, despite assurances that he gave to the governor, did not cancel the review.

The location of Granville Bastion shown on a 1711 map of Charleston.

=== Execution ===
On December 21, Johnson learned that up to 300 soldiers of the Charleston Militia had assembled in the city center and personally went to order their dispersal. Finding Parris among the militiamen, Johnson inquired “How durst ... [ye] appear in arms, contrary to ... [my] orders?” When Parris ignored the inquiry, Johnson moved closer to the man, whereupon Parris ordered his soldiers to level their muskets at Johnson. Johnson withdrew and the militia set out to Granville Bastion, the fortification on the southeast corner of the military works at Oyster Point and the traditional site for the inauguration of Carolinian governors. Johnson followed the march, shouting pleas at the soldiers to stop and obey his orders until he was shouted down by Rear Admiral Sir Hovenden Walker, who had thrown in with the putschists.

At Granville Bastion, Col. Moore met the arriving soldiers and - in front of them - was sworn in as acting governor of South Carolina. The coup passed without fighting or bloodshed.

== Aftermath ==
Among the revolutionary government's first orders of business was to petition the Crown to withdraw the proprietary charter of South Carolina and recreate it as a royal colony instead. By the following year, the revolutionary government's wishes were granted and direct, royal rule established. While the revolutionary government requested that Moore continue as royal governor, Francis Nicholson was instead installed by royal appointment.

After surrendering the government to Nicholson, Moore served as Speaker of the Commons House of Assembly until his death in 1724.

Royal rule effectively ended in South Carolina on March 26, 1776, when the governor, Lord William Campbell, was evacuated from the colony by the Royal Navy owing to increasing unrest in Charleston on the eve of the American Revolution. Control of the colony was then assumed by the revolutionary Committee of Safety. The following July, South Carolina ratified the United States Declaration of Independence.

== See also ==
- 1689 Boston revolt
- Bacon's Rebellion
- Gove's Rebellion
- Sword of State of South Carolina
