= Sword of State of South Carolina =

- Type: Sword
- Place of origin: Carolina (disputed)

Production history
- Designed: Prior to 1705
- No. built: 1

Specifications
- Length: 50 inches (130 cm)

The Sword of State of South Carolina is part of the colonial regalia of the Province of South Carolina, and formerly of the Province of Carolina, symbolizing the authority of the Crown in Carolina. Following the American Revolution, it was adopted as a symbol of the South Carolina Senate, but was stolen in 1941. Two replacements have since been used, the third and current one a gift from the Earl of Halifax. The Sword of State is listed in the FBI National Stolen Art File.

== Background ==
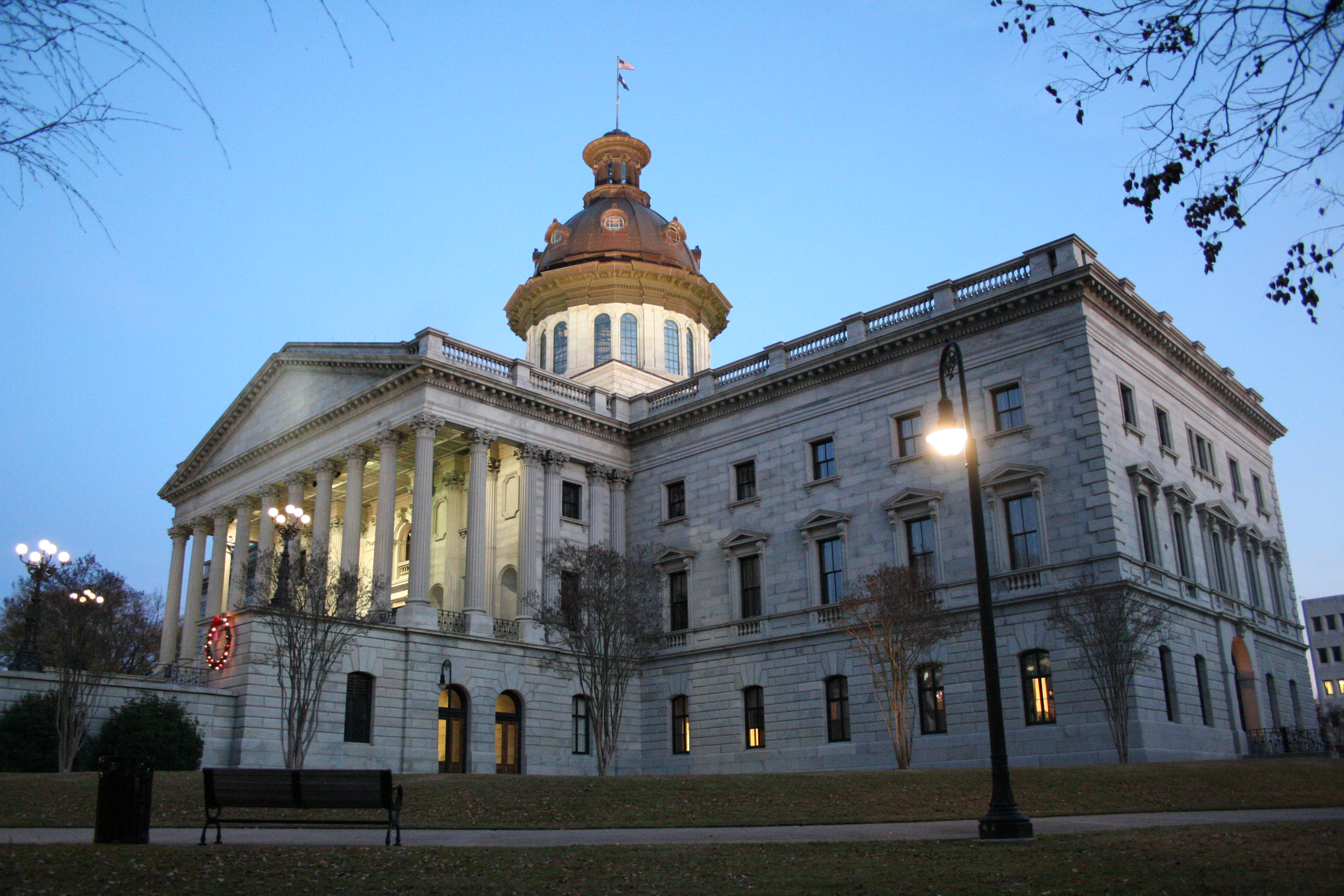
The 1951 replacement for the Sword of State is stored in the South Carolina Statehouse (pictured).

The 1951 Earl of Halifax sword is carried during the procession of the Senate during the 1995 inauguration of the Governor of South Carolina.

The provenance and origin of the Sword of State is unclear; however, it is known to have been adopted in 1704 by the Grand Council of the Lords Proprietors of Carolina and was used to precede state processions and ceremonies, such as the installation of governors. Following the overthrow of the Lords Proprietors in South Carolina's Revolution of 1719, authority for the sword passed to His Majesty's Council for South Carolina. After the declaration of independence of South Carolina in 1776, the sword was borne by the Sheriff of Charleston County and used to lead the procession of John Rutledge on the occasion of his inauguration as president of South Carolina. It was later deposited in the chamber of the South Carolina Senate where it remained, being occasionally used for Senate ceremonies, until the American Civil War when it was seized as a war trophy by the United States during the March to the Sea, and later lost. Some years later it was rediscovered in a museum in Philadelphia and returned to the South Carolina Senate.

In 1941 the Sword of State was stolen. State officials were initially unconcerned at its theft, assuming it would eventually be returned; the Mace of the South Carolina House of Representatives had periodically been stolen over the previous centuries and always recovered. However, in 1968 – with the sword still missing – state officials publicly requested the culprit return the artifact in time for the tricentennial of South Carolina, agreeing that "no questions" would be asked. As of 2019, the sword had still not been recovered. It is listed in the National Stolen Art File of the Federal Bureau of Investigation.

Following its theft, a cavalry saber was borrowed from the Charleston Museum for use by the Senate until 1951 when the Earl of Halifax, learning of the blade's loss, procured a replacement from Wilkinson Sword of London.

== Description ==
Only one photograph of the original Sword of State is known to exist.

The blade is wavy, 42 inches (110 cm) in length and made of what is believed to have been imported steel. The sword has a silver hilt, (8 inches (20 cm)), and was possibly crafted in Charleston, though some believe the craftsmanship too complex to have originated in colonial South Carolina.

== See also ==
- History of South Carolina
- Sword of state
