= Sword of state =

Sword used as part of the regalia of a monarch

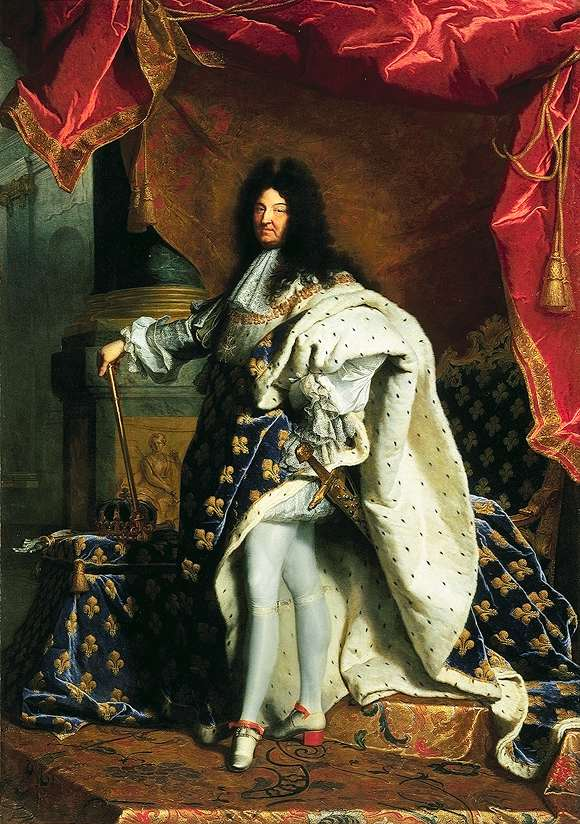
Portrait of Louis XIV in Coronation Robes with Joyeuse (by Hyacinthe Rigaud, 1701)

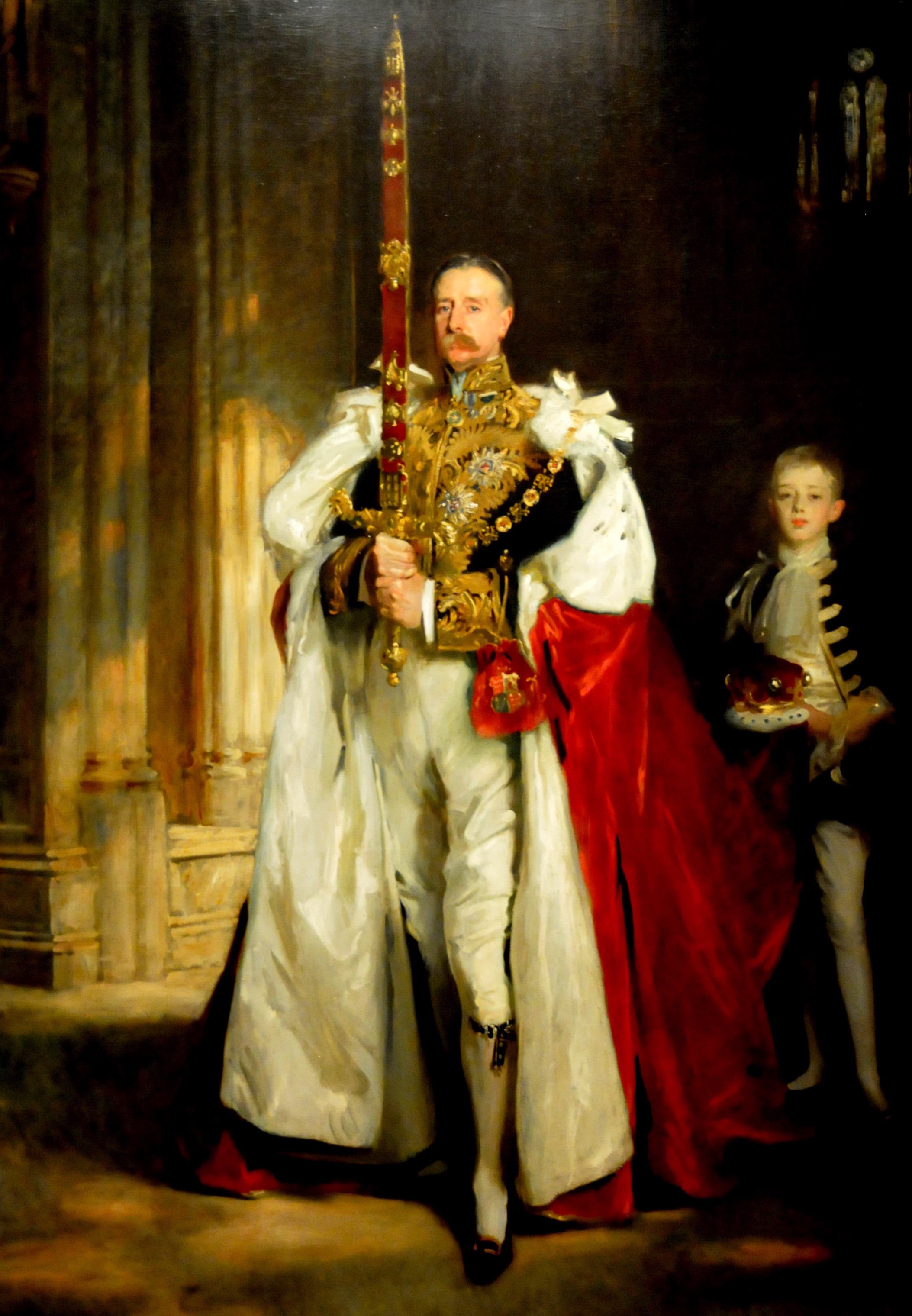
The Great Sword of State of the United Kingdom held by the 6th Marquess of Londonderry at the Coronation of King Edward VII, 1902

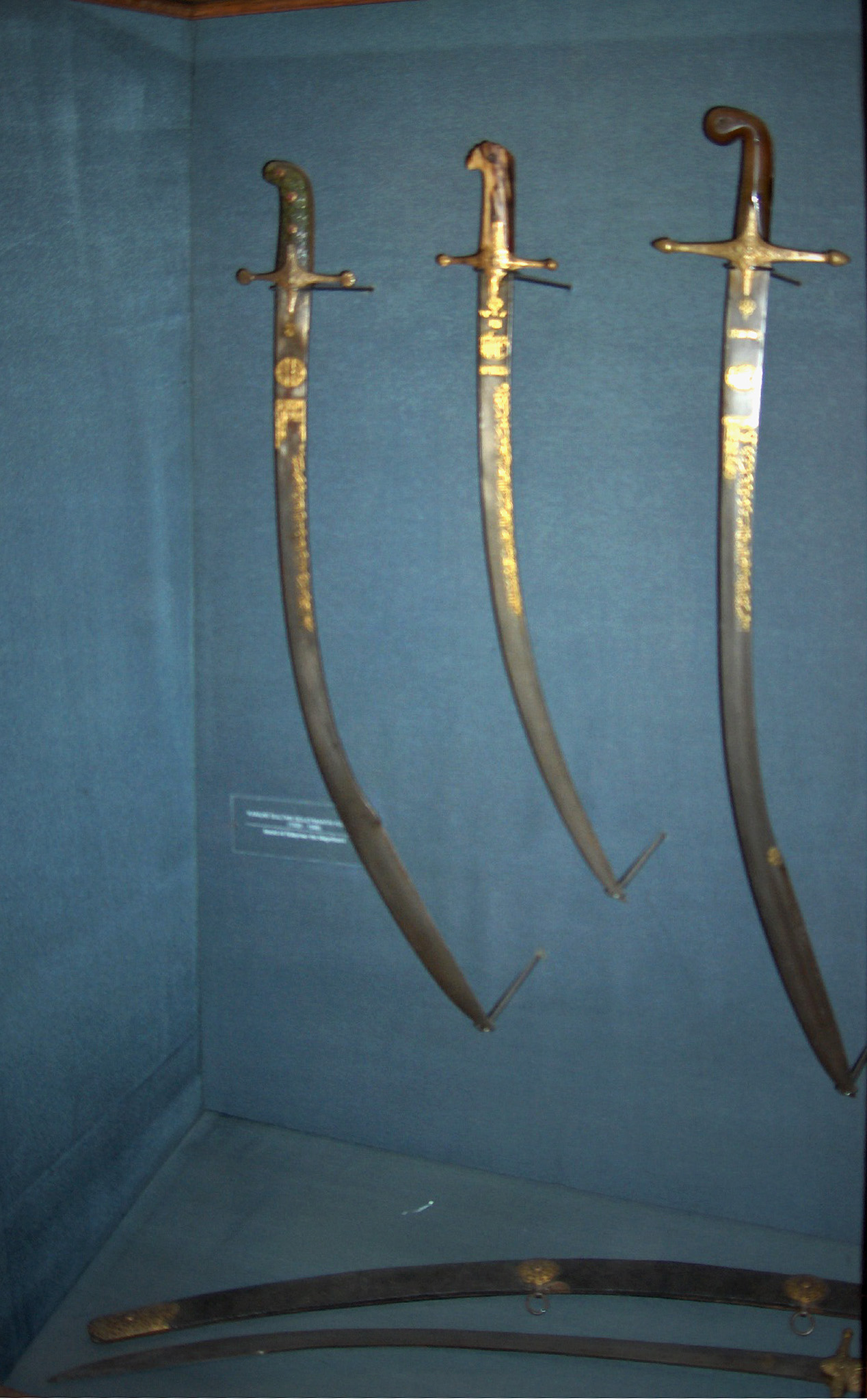
Swords of different Ottoman Sultans on display at the Topkapi Palace.

A sword of state is a sword, used as part of the regalia, symbolising the authority and power of a monarch, other high official or, sometimes, an institution. It is sometimes borne in front of the monarch or official.

It is known to be used in following monarchies:

- Reichsschwert of the Holy Roman Empire, see Imperial Sword
- Joyeuse, used for the sacre of the king of France. Reputed to be the sword of Charlemagne.
- Kingdom of Hungary
- Kingdom of Bohemia (Czech Republic) – Sword of Saint Wenceslas
- Kingdom of England, later Great Britain, then United Kingdom; see British crown jewels#Swords
- Kingdom of Scotland, see Honours of Scotland
- The former Kingdom of the Isle of Man (now a British Crown dependency), bearing the triskelion symbol, annually used on Tynwald Day
- Kingdom of the Netherlands, see Dutch Royal Regalia (made in 1840 for enthronements)
- Kingdom of Denmark, see Danish crown regalia
- Kingdom of Norway, see Regalia of Norway
- Kingdom of Sweden, see Swedish Royal Regalia, where it is the oldest of the Vasa regalia
- Kingdom of Poland – Szczerbiec and two Grunwald Swords
- Kingdom of Mysore – Chikka Devaraja Wodeyar, ending with the Krishnaraja Wodeyar II
- Empire of Russia, see Regalia of the Russian tsars
- The Kingdom of Georgia
- The Sword of Osman, given to Sultans of the Ottoman Empire
- In the former sultanate of the Maldives, being invested on the Monarch in a traditional gong ceremony
- Kingdom of Thailand or Siam- the Sword of Victory, one of the five Regalia of Thailand.
- Shangfang Baojian (simplified Chinese: 尚方宝剑; traditional Chinese: 尚方寶劍) of Chinese dynasties from Han dynasty to Qing dynasty
- The Eodo of Taejo of Joseon Dynasty, Korea
- Kusanagi, kept by the Emperor of Japan
- Also in the Malay world, notably in
  - the sultanate of Perak, where it gave the name to a 'national' order of knighthood
  - Sarawak (on Borneo)

Swords of state are also used in some republics, as in the Senate of the state of South Carolina in the United States of America.

== See also ==
- Sword of justice – similar part of regalia
- Ceremonial weapons – several types can be part of regalia
- Signature weapon
- Sword of the State – a title
