= Edge (shaving gel) =

American brand

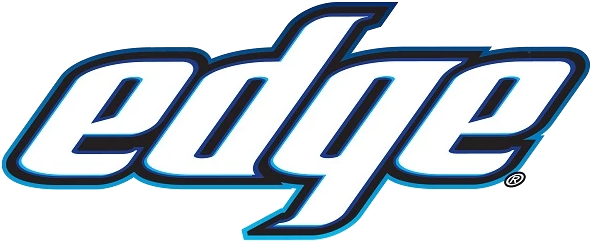

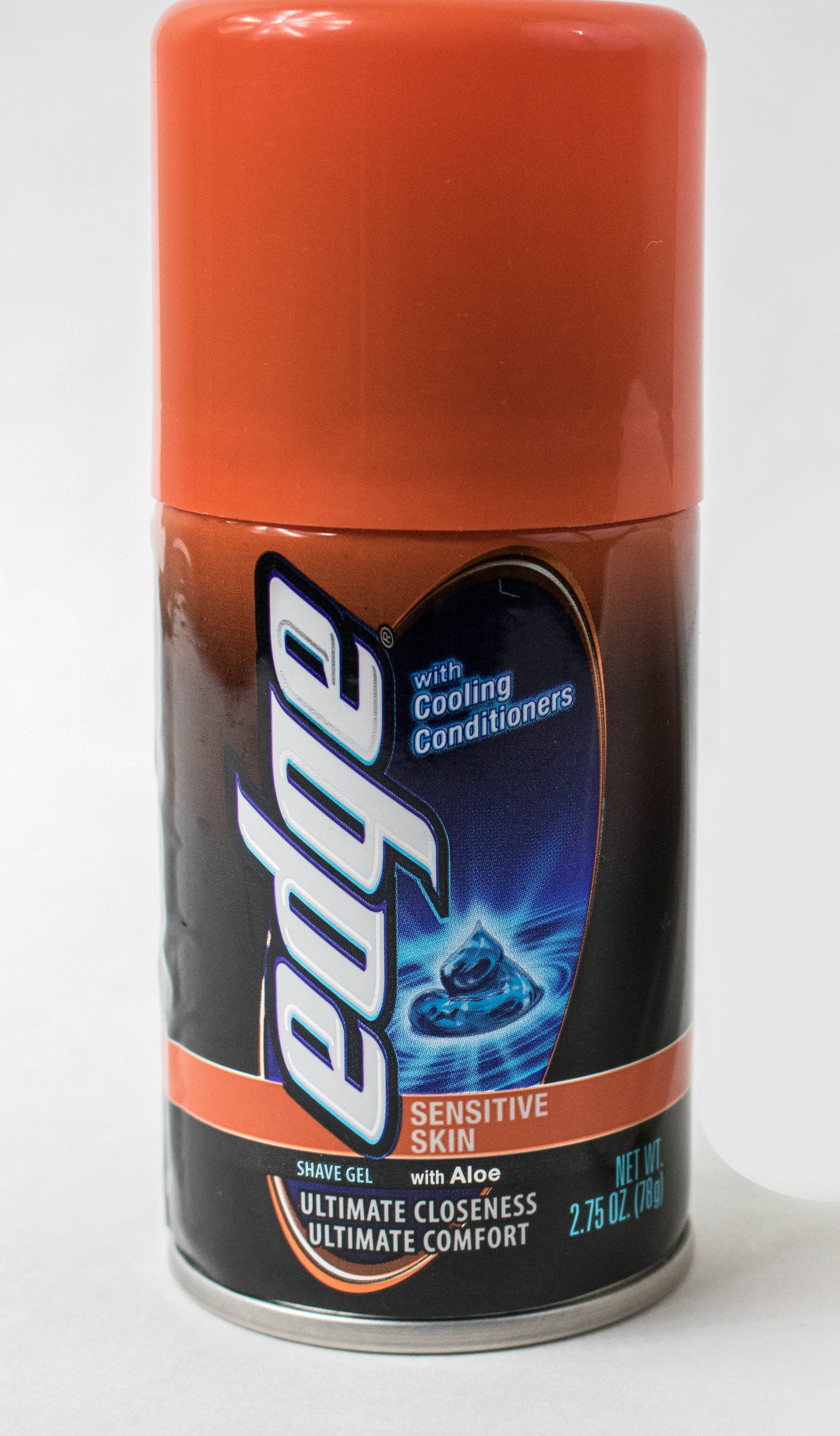
- A can of Sensitive Skin Edge
- Product type: Shaving gel
- Current owner: Edgewell Personal Care
- Country: United States
- Introduced: March 24, 1970; 56 years ago
- Markets: North America
- Previous owners: S. C. Johnson & Son
- Website: schick.com/edge

Edge is an American brand of shaving gel manufactured by Edgewell Personal Care. The line includes Sensitive Skin, Extra Moisturizing, Extra Protection, Ultra Sensitive, Clean and Refreshing, and Soothing Aloe.

== History ==
S. C. Johnson & Son launched the Edge brand nationally in the United States on March 24, 1970 with a $4 million advertising campaign. By 1975, Edge was reported to hold "10 percent or so" of the shaving cream and gel market and reached a 17% market share by 1982.

== Lawsuits ==
S. C. Johnson held a patent for the shaving gel and successfully sued Carter-Wallace for infringement based on its Rise brand gel. As a result, Rise gel was withdrawn from the market.

The company also successfully sued The Gillette Company for infringement based on its Foamy brand gel. Foamy, which had long been the best-selling shaving cream, had introduced a gel version in 1983 to compete with Edge. The trial court in the Gillette lawsuit found that Edge accounted for more than 20% of the market for shaving products at the time of trial, and the appellate court described the Edge gel product as "an overwhelming commercial success". Despite the lawsuit, Foamy gel remained on the market because by the time of the trial court's decision, S. C. Johnson's patent had expired. By 1993, Edge had reached 30% of the shaving cream and gel market, leading the category.

== Sale to Energizer Holdings ==
S. C. Johnson sold the Edge brand to Energizer Holdings in 2009 to focus more on household chemicals and fragrances. In turn, Energizer spun off its personal care brands, including Edge, as a new corporation, Edgewell Personal Care, in 2015.
