= HEADstrong Foundation =

American nonprofit supporting cancer patients' families

The HEADstrong Foundation is a charitable, non-profit organization that offers financial, residential, and emotional support to families affected by cancer. The Foundation is based just outside of Philadelphia, where patients often travel seeking care and leaving their homes behind. The HEADstrong Foundation supports cancer patients and their families with peer support, comfort kits, financial help and lodging for families who have no place to stay while in the Philadelphia area.

The charity was founded in 2006 by Nicholas "Head" Colleluori, who was diagnosed with B-cell Non-Hodgkin's lymphoma during his sophomore year of college. Colleluori was a student-athlete playing men's lacrosse at NCAA Division I Hofstra University when he was diagnosed with large B-cell Non-Hodgkin's lymphoma. He had to leave Hofstra in order to undergo chemotherapy, radiation, a stem cell transplant, and other experimental treatments. He died in 2006, the same year the Foundation was started.

== Bibliography ==
- Vaccaro, Chris R. (2011). Hofstra athletics. Charleston, S.C.: Arcadia Pub. ISBN 978-0-7385-7664-0.
- Beck, Stan; Jack Wilkinson (2013). College sports traditions : picking up Butch, silent night, and hundreds of others. Lanham, MD: Scarecrow Press. ISBN 978-0-8108-9120-3.
