= Schick (razors) =

American personal care brand

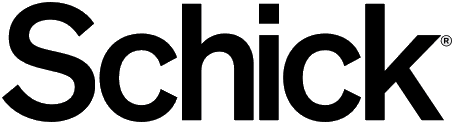

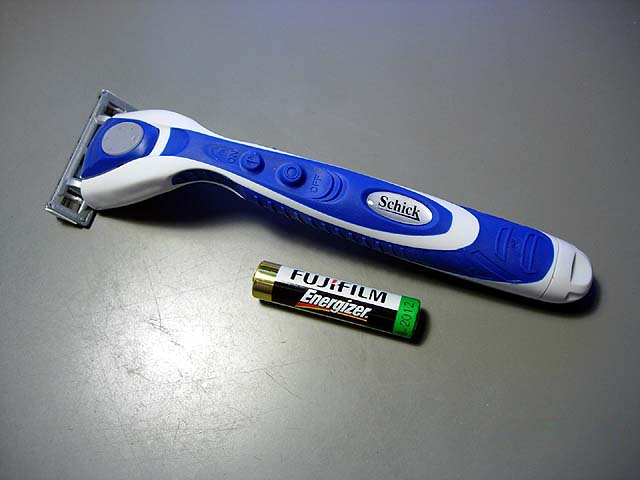
- Quatro4 Titanium razor
- Product type: Safety razor
- Current owner: Edgewell Personal Care
- Country: United States
- Introduced: 1926; 100 years ago (as Magazine Repeating Razor Company) by Jacob Schick
- Related brands: Wilkinson Sword
- Markets: 20 countries
- Previous owners: Patrick Frawley (1955–1970); Warner–Lambert (1970–2000); Pfizer (2000–2003); Energizer Holdings (2003–2015)
- Tagline: "Free your skin"
- Website: schick.com

Schick is an American brand of personal care products and safety razors which was founded in 1926 by Jacob Schick. It is currently owned by Edgewell Personal Care.

Throughout the years, Schick has been second in sales to Gillette globally. On a number of occasions, the two companies have sued one another over patent infringement. The Schick brand was the top-selling brand of safety razors and blades in Japan. The Schick name is used in North America, Australia, Asia and Russia. In Europe, the same items are sold under the Wilkinson Sword brand name.

Schick also markets shaving gels.

== History ==
Schick was founded in 1926 by Jacob Schick as the Magazine Repeating Razor Company. Schick developed a single-blade safety razor system, which stored twenty blades in a steel injector. It wasn't until 1929 that Schick's idea for a razor that could be used without lather hit the market.

In 1931, he opened a factory in Stamford, Connecticut that employed 100 people. By 1937, the company had produced over a million Schick Dry Shavers and the facility had 1,500 employees. Laboratories in Montreal had also been established. The original Stamford facility was closed in 1955 and operations moved to Lancaster, Pennsylvania. The company remained in Lancaster until 1979.

Patrick Frawley purchased controlling shares in Schick in 1955. It was first listed on the New York Stock Exchange in 1957. The company began to diversify starting in 1962, introducing hair dryers, polishers, electric toothbrushes, and a line of toiletries. Schick entered Japan in 1961, capturing five percent of the market in just four years. In 1965, Eversharp and Technicolor, Inc. purchased a 27.5 percent stake in Schick Electric from Revlon. In 1970, the company became a division of Warner–Lambert. The company's name was changed to Schick Electric in 1972. In 1985, the company held a commanding 70 percent of the Japanese market. By 1990, Schick claimed 16.4 percent of the US market.

In 1993, Warner-Lambert acquired the North American and European rights to the Wilkinson Sword brand, pairing it with Schick. By 1997, Schick had captured 40 percent of the market in Germany.

In February 2000, Pfizer bought Warner—Lambert along with all of its subsidiaries. Pfizer brought in new management, cancelled a number of research projects, and pushed Schick to introduce the Quattro and Intuition. It then put the business up for auction, with Reckitt Benckiser, Energizer Holdings, Rayovac, and Bic showing interest.

In 2003, Schick was purchased by Energizer for $930 million. By 2011, Schick managed to capture 19 percent of the US men's razor market. On July 1, 2015, Energizer split into two companies and Schick is now a brand of Edgewell Personal Care. In 2017, Schick started its own shave club under the Hydro Connect name.

In 2025, the company announced it would shutter its Milford, Connecticut factory by 2027.

== Products ==
- Schick Hydro: Schick's redesigned razor system released in 2010. It featured a five-blade razor system with "skin guards advanced hydrating gel and a flip trimmer" (hydrates only while shaving). A three-blade variant was also released without the flip trimmer. A powered version and the Hydro Silk for women was also introduced soon after. Disposable versions were added in 2013 and a groomer was released in 2014.
- Schick Intuition: A women's shaving system that lathers and shaves at the same time was introduced in 2003. A bi-directional version was released in 2018 under the f.a.b. (forward and backward) name. A bamboo variant was introduced in 2022.
- Schick Quattro: A four-bladed razor for men, introduced in 2003. A motorized version was introduced. In 2008, Schick introduced its Quattro Titanium line. Quattro for Women was also introduced.
- Schick Protector: A razor claimed to protect against nicks was released in 1997. Originally introduced by Wilkinson Sword in Europe in 1992 and Japan in 1995, it was marketed toward teenagers.
- Schick Tracer: A two-bladed razor with flexible blades was released in 1991.
- Schick Xtreme3: A three-blade men's shaving razor. A disposable version was introduced by in 1999. In 2021, a disposable razor made of 100% recycled plastic was released. A bamboo variant was introduced in 2022.
- Schick Slim Twin: A two-bladed disposable razor that comes in four different varieties.
- Schick Double Edge Razor, also known as Schick Krona: A Twist-To-Open safety razor produced from 1965 until the late 1970s.
- Schick Injector Razor: A single edge injector style family of razors introduced in 1935 and produced until the early 2000s. (The blades are still manufactured)
- Schick Exacta: General disposable razors with or without lubricating strip.
