= Nock gun =

18th-century long firearm

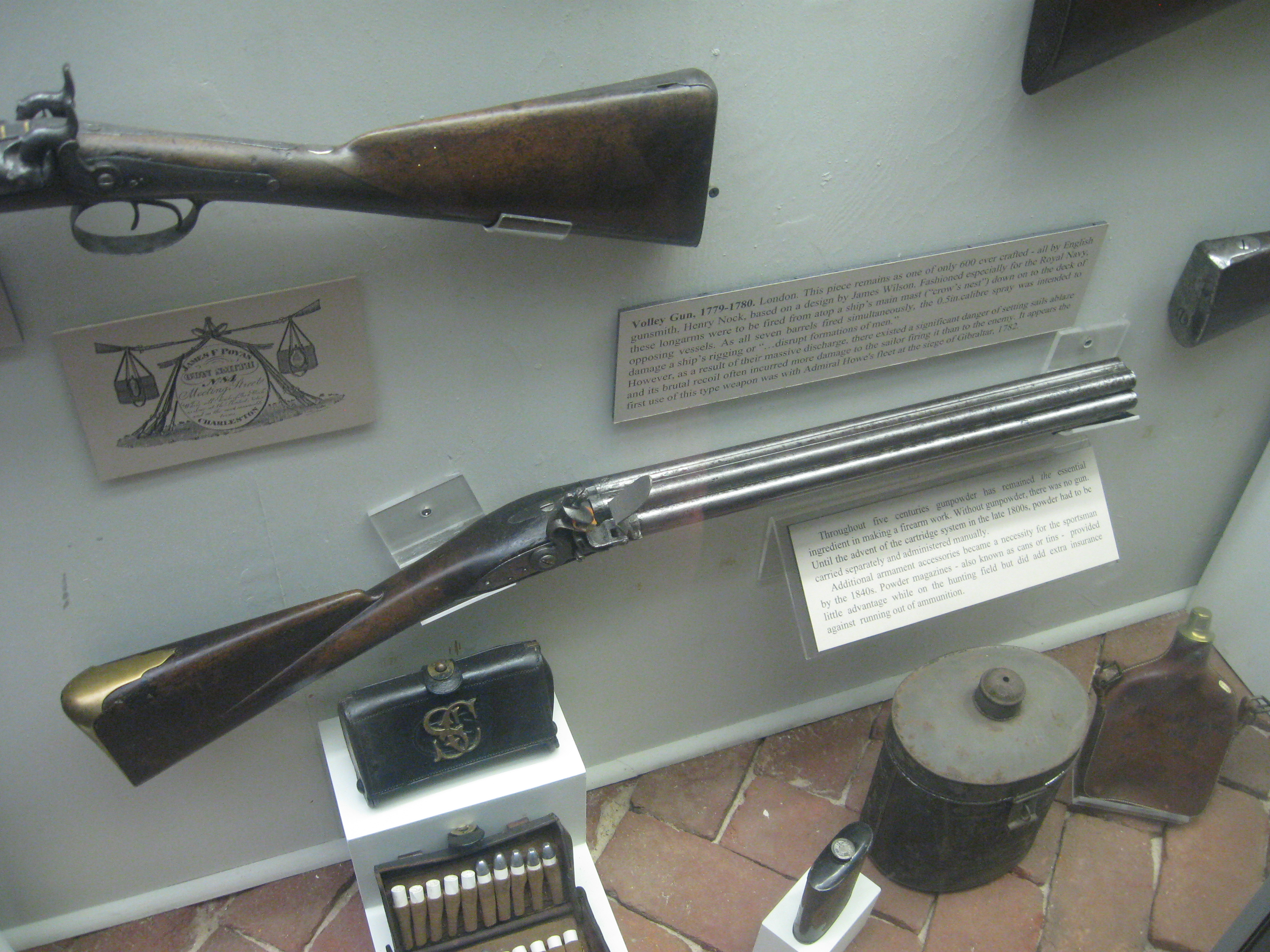
- A Nock volley gun in the Charleston Museum 1779–1780
- Type: Volley gun
- Place of origin: Great Britain

Service history
- In service: Royal Navy 1782–1804
- Used by: United Kingdom
- Wars: Napoleonic Wars

Production history
- Designed: 1779

Specifications
- Barrel length: 20 inches (510 mm)
- Caliber: .46 inches (12 mm)
- Barrels: 7
- Action: Flintlock, multiple barrel
- Rate of fire: Seven rounds per discharge, reloading rate variable
- Muzzle velocity: Variable
- Effective firing range: Variable
- Feed system: Muzzle-loaded

The Nock gun was a seven-barrelled flintlock smoothbore firearm used by the Royal Navy during the early stages of the Napoleonic Wars. It is a type of volley gun adapted for ship-to-ship fighting, but was limited in its use because of the powerful recoil and eventually discontinued.

Its operation and historical importance has led to it being portrayed in modern fictional works, notably in The Alamo feature film, and the Richard Sharpe series of novels by Bernard Cornwell.

== History and design ==
The weapon was invented by British engineer James Wilson in 1779, and named after Henry Nock, the London-based armaments manufacturer contracted to build the gun. The Board of Ordnance rejected it for army use but adopted it for naval use in the role of being fired from the tops of Royal Navy warships. The simultaneous discharge of seven barrels with a single pull of the trigger would have devastating effect on the tightly packed groups of enemy sailors.

The volley gun consisted of seven barrels welded together, with small vents drilled through from the central barrel to the other six barrels clustered around it. The central barrel screwed onto a hollow spigot which formed the chamber and was connected to the vent.

The gun operated using a standard flintlock mechanism, with the priming gunpowder igniting the central charge via a small vent. When the flash reached the central chamber, all seven charges ignited at once, firing more or less simultaneously.

The first two test guns featured rifled barrels but all the later ones including those used in trials were smoothbore.

== Deployment and use ==
In 1780, 500 Nock guns were purchased by the Royal Navy at a price of £13 per gun. However, attempts to use the gun during combat quickly revealed design flaws. The recoil caused by all seven barrels firing at once was more powerful than had been thought, and frequently injured or broke the shoulder of whoever was firing the gun, and in any case made the gun very difficult to control. Furthermore, officers were reluctant to issue the guns during battle out of fear that the flying sparks would set fire to the surrounding rigging and sails.

A smaller, lighter version was produced, which shortened the gun's range, but the recoil was still too powerful for sailors to feel comfortable firing it. A total of 655 guns of all models were eventually purchased. The guns were removed from service in the Royal Navy in 1804.

Examples are available for viewing in the Hollywood Guns exhibit at the National Firearms Museum, the Royal Armouries Museum, and the Charleston Museum (SC).

=== Private purchasers ===
Henry Nock and others managed to sell a number of guns in the sporting market. A 14-barrel version that was sold to Thomas Thornton by Dupe & Co survived in the Musèe d'Armes in Liège later the Curtius Museum.

== Popular culture ==
The Nock gun was brought to modern attention in the 1960 film The Alamo in which one is used by actor Richard Widmark, playing Jim Bowie. The gun used in the film is now in the National Firearms Museum. Nock guns can be seen in realistic period films including Master and Commander: The Far Side of the World, and fantasy films Jonah Hex and Abraham Lincoln: Vampire Hunter.

In Bernard Cornwell's series of historical novels featuring Richard Sharpe and, more recently, in the Sharpe TV series, a Nock gun is used by the character Patrick Harper. A modern version was custom-built in an episode of American Guns.
