= Moore family (Carolinas) =

The Moore family was an American political family in North and South Carolina during the 18th and 19th centuries.

The family is most closely associated with the Cape Fear coastal region around Wilmington. Several members of the family held political positions in colonial North and South Carolina, were senior officers in the Continental Army during the American Revolutionary War, or held high positions in the United States Federal Government during the early years of the republic.

The family claimed descent from Rory O'Moore, leader of the Irish Rebellion of 1641, who was descended from Gaelic Irish nobility. However, James Moore Sr.'s official seal bore the swan and arms of the Moore family of Devonshire, suggesting his origins were English. It appears Moore emigrated from England to Barbados, then eventually to mainland North America.

== James Sr. ==
James Moore Sr. was the patriarch of the family. He served as the governor of the Carolina from 1700-1703. He had two sons, James Jr. and Maurice.

== James Jr. ==
James Moore Jr. was a colonel in the colonial militia who served in the Yamassee War and would be a governor of the Province of South Carolina after North and South Carolina split. He served in that position 1719-1721.

== Maurice Sr. ==
Maurice had been a speaker of the North Carolina legislature. As speaker the Maurice Moore had championed settlement of the Cape Fear region under Governor George Burrington and led frequent conflicts with Burrington's successor, Richard Everard. Maurice had two sons, named James and Maurice.

== Maurice Jr. ==
Maurice Moore II had been appointed as a Judge, but when the younger Maurice became a vocal opponent of the Stamp Act, he was removed from the bench by Governor William Tryon. Both he and his brother James served in the colonial legislature. He had at least one son, Alfred.

== James III ==
General James Moore served in the Continental Army, first as a colonel, and later, after he distinguished himself leading the troops at the Battle of Moore's Creek Bridge, as a Brigadier General and commander of the Southern Department, a position he would only hold for a few months before his sudden death in April, 1777.

== Alfred ==
Alfred Moore would serve as an officer in the Continental Army, and later as an Associate Justice of the United States Supreme Court.

== Other people related to the Moore family ==
- General Robert Howe was a Major General in the Continental Army and was a great-grandson of Governor James Moore.
