= Proraso =

Italian brand of shaving products

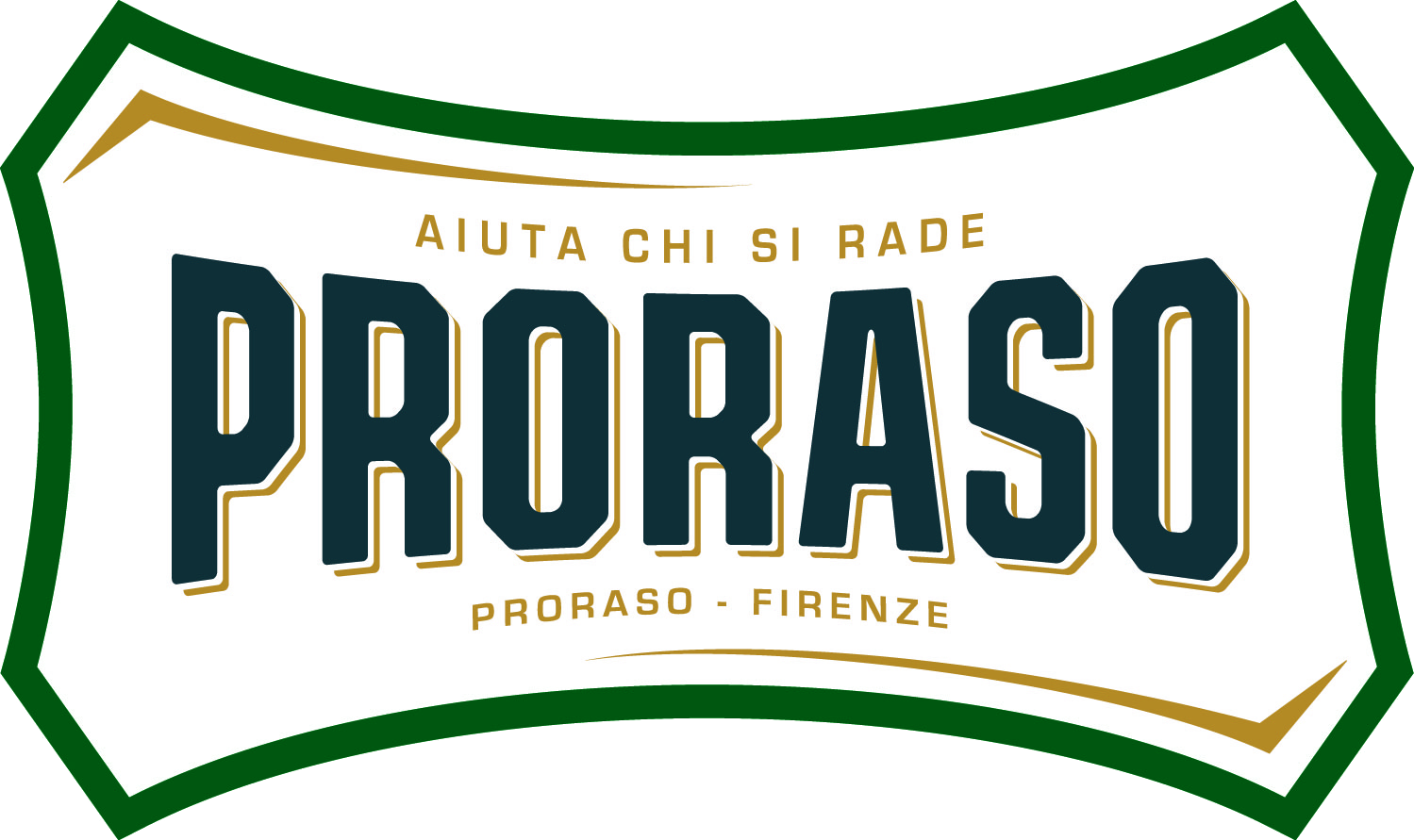
- Product type: Shaving soap, shaving cream, pre- and post-shave products, other shaving supplies
- Current owner: Ludovico Martelli S.r.l
- Country: Italy
- Introduced: 1948; 78 years ago
- Related brands: Marvis; Kaloderma; Oxy; Schultz
- Website: www.proraso.com

Proraso is a personal care and grooming brand owned by the Italian company Ludovico Martelli srl. The brand includes men's barber supplies and scented shaving products, and consists of five different product lines aimed at the general public and a "Pro" line aimed at professional barbers, which contains three variants. The Proraso pre-shave cream has been in production since 1948.

In 2009, the company's turnover was €36,000,000 ranking sixth in the national market in producing rapid foams, third for shaving cream with brush, and first for pre- and aftershave creams. In 2017, the turnover marks an all-time high, reaching 61 million euros, an increase of 18% compared to the previous year.

== Products ==
The Proraso brand includes five main product lines, four of which are marketed internationally.

- "Green" line products are marketed in green packaging and designed for general use. This line is scented primarily with eucalyptus oil and menthol and is the first line of products introduced. It contains pre-shaving cream, shaving soap, shaving cream, beard shampoo, beard balm, beard oil, shaving foam, aftershave lotion, and aftershave balm.
- "White" line products are marketed in white packaging, designed for sensitive skin, and contain green tea and oatmeal extracts. This line is scented with lime and apple. It does not have an aftershave lotion equivalent.
- "Red" line products, marketed in red packaging and designed to soften coarser hair, containing shea butter. This line is scented with sandalwood. It offers a pre-shave cream, an aftershave splash, and an aftershave balm, all matching the sandalwood scent of the shaving cream.
- "Blue" line products are marketed in blue packaging and designed to moisturize, containing vitamin E and aloe vera extract. This line is scented with musk and "amber". The blue line contains only shaving cream, shaving foam, and aftershave balm. Recently a pre-shaving cream was introduced for this line.
- "Yellow" line products are marketed in yellow packaging and are designed to provide a close shave and moisturize. They contain cocoa butter and shea butter. This line is scented with vanilla and contains only one product: shaving foam. It is not sold outside Italy.

The "Single Blade" line also contains three variants directed at professionals. This line offers products with much more complex fragrances.

- "Wood and Spice" line products are marketed in yellow packaging. They are scented with cumin, saffron, cedar, and sandalwood. The line contains pre-shaving cream, shaving cream, aftershave balm, cologne, beard shampoo, beard balm, beard oil, moustache wax, and hot beard treatment oil.
- "Azur Lime" line products are marketed in dark blue packaging. They are scented with lime, mint, wood, juniper berries, musk, and patchouli. The line contains pre-shaving cream, shaving cream, aftershave balm, cologne, beard shampoo, beard balm, and beard oil.
- "Cypress & Vetyver" line products are marketed in dark green packaging. They are scented with cypress, bergamot, vetiver, cedarwood, and amber. The line contains pre-shaving cream, shaving cream, aftershave balm, cologne, beard shampoo, beard balm, and beard oil.

The brand also includes a shaving brush and a metallic aftershave vaporizer, among other accessories for professional barbers.

== Bibliography ==
- Douglas, Theo (25 May 2006). "Trendzilla on Proraso". Orange County Weekly.
