= Aftershave =

Liquid applied to the shaved area of the face after shaving

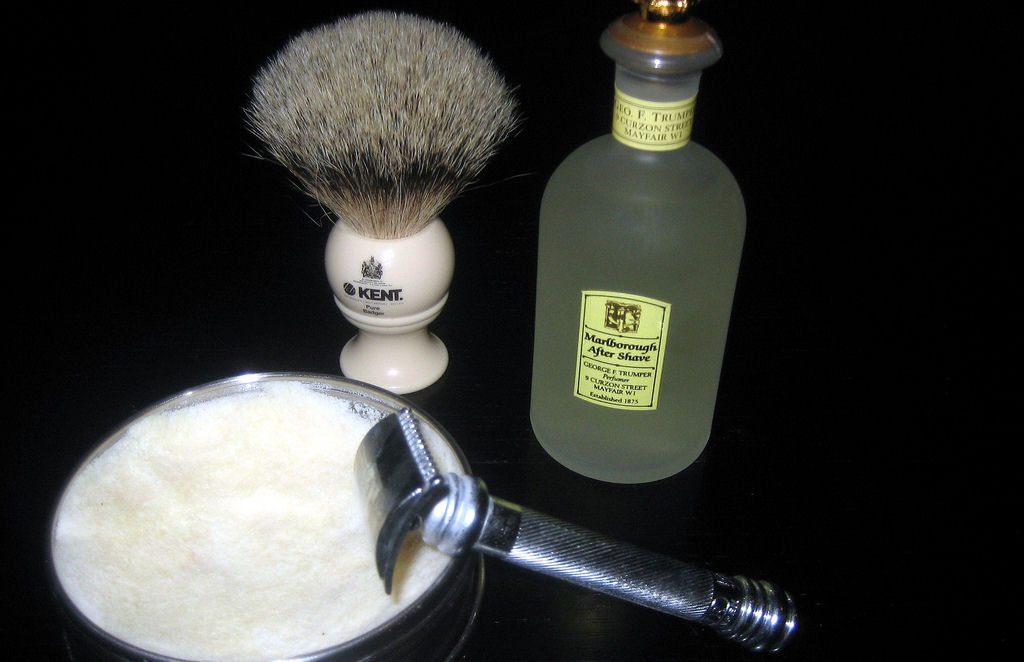
Aftershave in a bottle alongside a shaving brush, shaving soap, and a safety razor

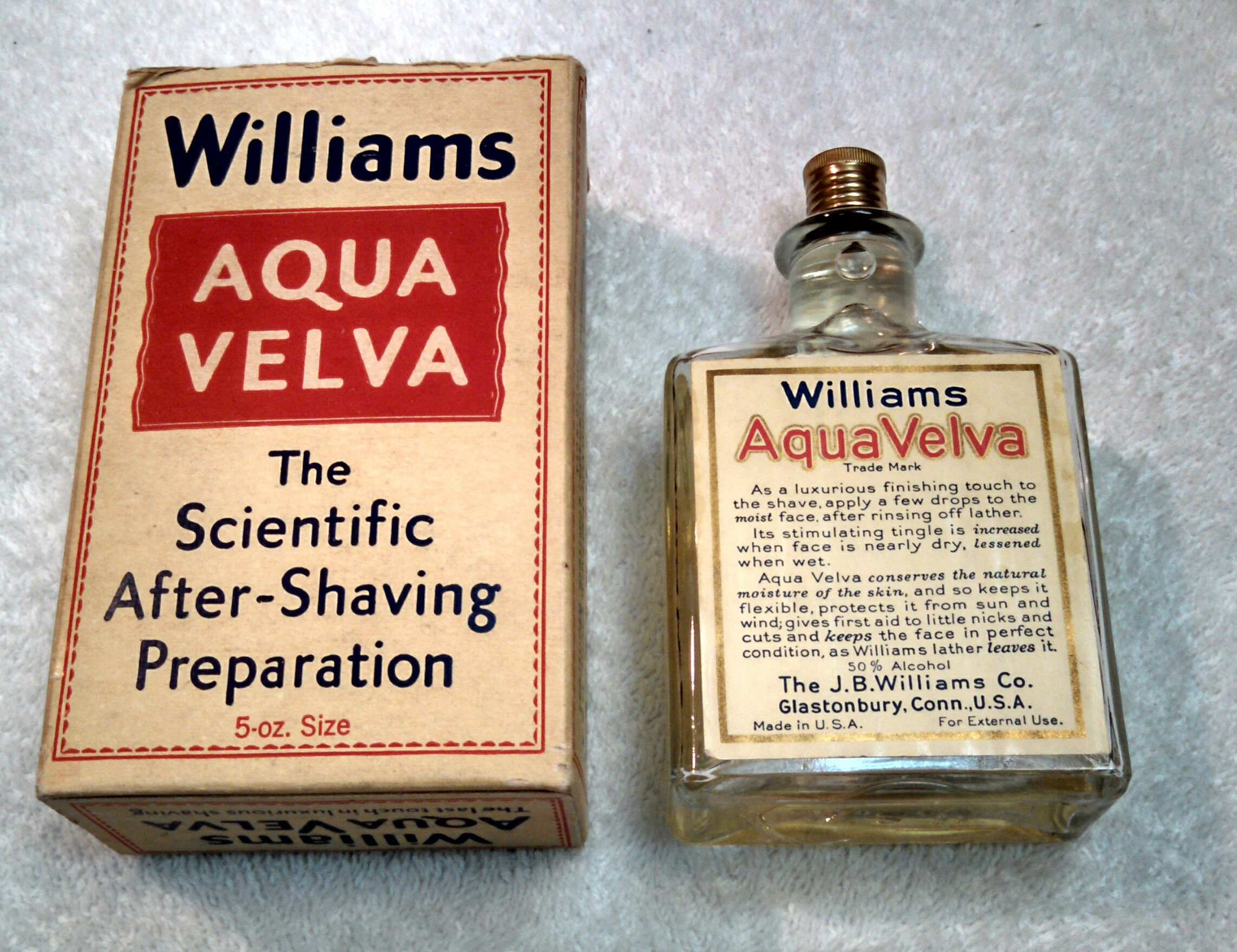
Williams Aqua Velva aftershave from the 1930s

Aftershave is a product applied to skin after shaving. Traditionally, it is an alcohol-based liquid (splash), but it can be a lotion, gel, or even a paste.

It often contains an antiseptic agent such as denatured alcohol, stearate citrate or witch hazel to prevent infection of cuts, as well as to act as an astringent to reduce skin irritation. Menthol is used in some varieties as well to numb irritated skin.

== Types ==
=== Splash ===
Aftershave is sometimes mistakenly referred to as Eau de Cologne due to the very similar nature of the two products. Some aftershave manufacturers encourage using their fragranced aftershave as if it were cologne, in order to increase sales by encouraging consumers to use it in a more versatile manner, rather than just after a shaving session. Some aftershaves were inspired by cologne.

=== Balm ===
Aftershave balms are frequently recommended for winter use as they tend to be alcohol free and lotion-like, moisturizing the skin. Moisturizers—natural and artificial—are often touted as able to soften the skin.

== Ingredients ==
Early aftershaves included witch-hazel and bay rum, and have been documented in shaving guides. Both are still sold as aftershaves. Some aftershaves use fragrance or essential oil to enhance scent. An alcohol-based aftershave usually causes an immediate stinging sensation after applying it post-shave, with effects sometimes lasting several minutes, but most commonly only for seconds. Non-alcohol-based products also exist.

== See also ==
- Barber
- Beard
- Head shaving
- Leg shaving
- Razors
- Shaving cream
- Shaving soap
- Aqua Velva – A brand of aftershave
- Bay rum – Type of cologne and aftershave lotion
- Burma-Shave – U.S. shaving cream (introduced 1925)
- Old Spice – American brand of male grooming products
