= American Safety Razor Company =

Personal care brand

- Formerly: Personna American Safety Razor Company
- Type: Subsidiary
- Industry: Metallurgy
- Founded: January 1906; 120 years ago
- Fate: Filed for bankruptcy in 2010, acquired by Energizer Holdings
- Successors: Edgewell (2015–present); Energizer (2010–15)
- Headquarters: Verona, Virginia, U.S.
- Products: Safety razors, shaving brushes, and other personal care products
- Owner: Philip Morris (1960-1977)

American Safety Razor Company is a personal care brand founded in 1906 by a merger of the Gem Cutlery Company and Ever-Ready. It is a principal competitor to Gillette, with which it shared a name from 1901 to 1904, when the latter renamed for its founder, King C. Gillette. It produces a range of personal care, medical and industrial blades with manufacturing operations in the Czech Republic, Germany, Israel, Mexico and the United States.

== History ==
=== Star Safety Razor ===
In 1870, Frederick, Otto and Richard Kampfe immigrated from Saxony, Germany establishing a tool and die shop in Brooklyn, New York. After becoming frustrated with shaving, Frederick modified a straight razor by shortening the blade and setting it in a frame. The device became known as Kampfe's rake and was produced for friends and customers at the New York shop. In 1875 the brothers formed the Star Safety Razor company and on June 15, 1880 were granted a U.S. patent for the Star Razor, the first safety razor produced in the United States.

=== Gem Cutlery Company ===
After 23 years working for the Kampfe Brothers, Jerry Reichard starts the Gem Cutlery Company in 1898. Its first product, the Gem Safety Razor, borrowed heavily from the Star Razor in design but soon outpaced the Star in sales.

=== Ever-Ready ===
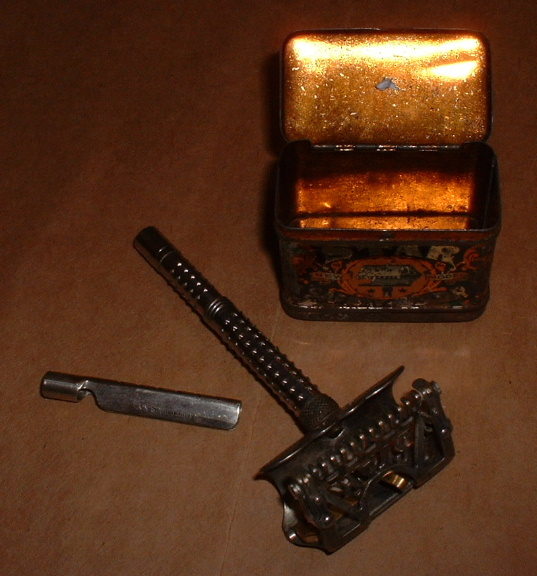
Kampfe Brothers 1903 Star Razor

In 1903, Jerry Reichard left Gem Safety Razor Company to form another company with August Scheuber. It was briefly named the Reichard & Scheuber Manufacturing Company before it became The Yankee Company. it made wedge-blade razors under the name Yankee, Mohican & Winner. It was renamed Ever-Ready in 1905. Gem and Ever-Ready merged in 1906, incorporated as the American Safety Razor Company.

In 1906, abandoning the wedge-blade design, it introduced the single-edge rib-back blade still used today. In 1915, Ever-Ready Shaving Brushes were introduced and produced until the early 1990s.

=== Safetee Soap Corporation ===
In December 1919 the Safetee Soap Corporation was formed as a subsidiary of American Safety Razor Corporation and produced a line of shaving soaps and complementary creams, powders, talc and aftershave lotions. It was advertised in pamphlets for existing products.

=== American Safety Razor Corporation ===
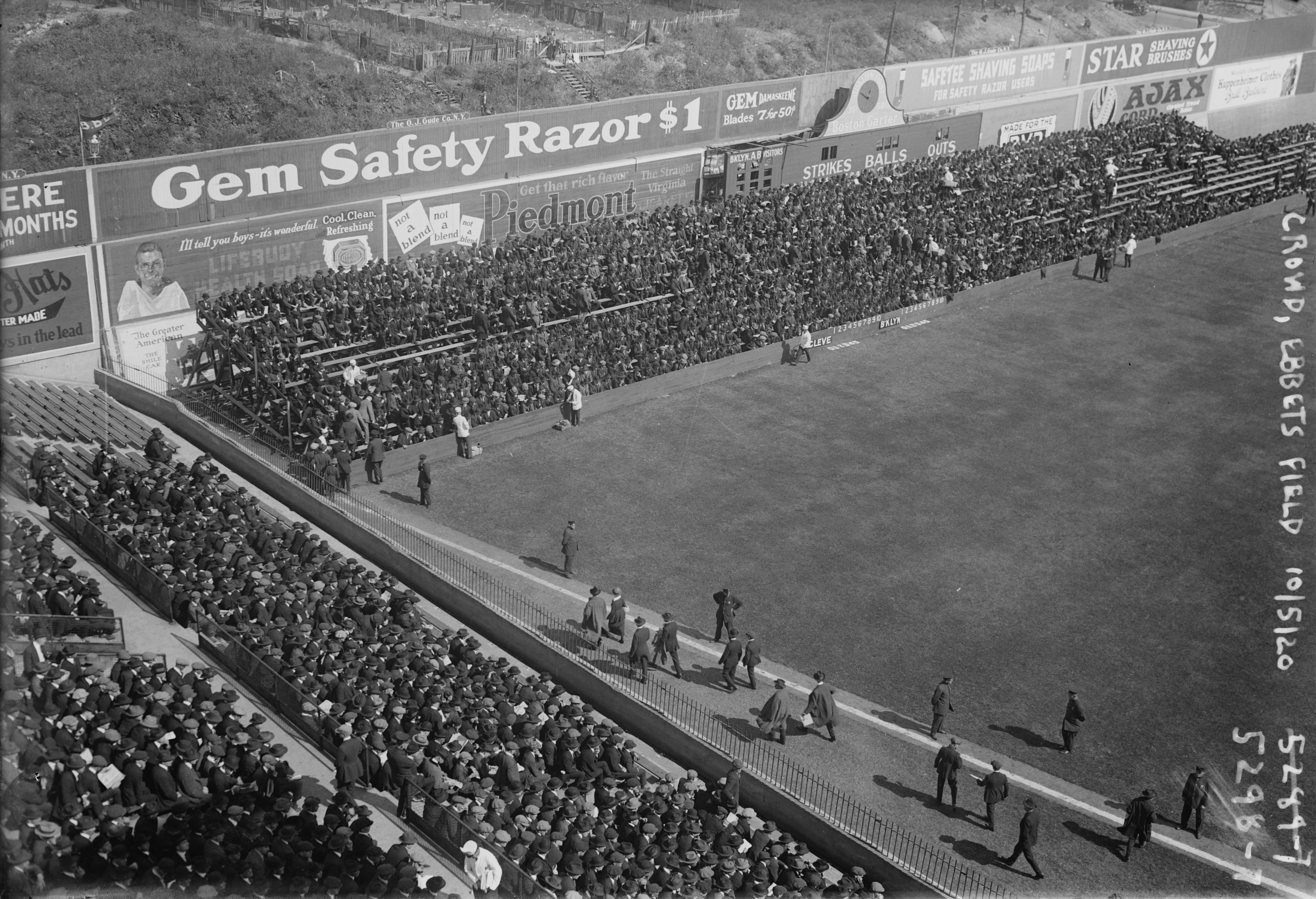
Gem Safety Razor advertised at the 1920 World Series at Ebbets Field

Gem and Ever-Ready merged with Star to become the "American Safety Razor Corporation" in 1919. It was chartered in Virginia, while razor and blade production remained in Brooklyn. By 1921, it had produced 1.8 million safety razors, 110 million razor blades, a million shaving brushes and two million cakes of soap.

By 1942, it had introduced and popularized the phrase "five o'clock shadow". In 1953, it acquired the Pal, Treet and Personna brands after purchasing the Pal Blade Company. These latter two product names continue to be made today.

In 1954 the factory relocated to Staunton, Virginia, after the Brooklyn City Planning Commission's planned civic center encroached on the factory with plans to redevelop the industrial area into office and residential use. The American Safety Razor factory building at 333 Jay Street then became the new campus for the Polytechnic Institute of Brooklyn.

Seeking diversification, Philip Morris acquired American Safety Razor in 1960. In 1963 American Safety Razor became the first maker of stainless steel blades, which were sold under the Personna brand name. In 1968 Philip Morris purchased the Burma-Vita Company, makers of Burma-Shave. In 1970, the first blade made with tungsten steel was introduced, the Personna 74. In 1974 American Line Brand of industrial products was introduced, expanding the company into industrial blades. In 1977, executives purchased Personna American Safety Razor Company from Philip Morris in a management buyout.

American Safety Razor filed for bankruptcy in July 2010, after declining earnings since 2008 and the loss of its largest customer Walmart earlier in 2010. Energizer Holdings bought American Safety Razor in November 2010 for US$301 million. In 2015, Energizer Holdings spun off the personal care division as Edgewell Personal Care. The company also announced its intention to cut back its industrial blade production or completely sell the personal care division. Edgewell announced the sale of its Personna Industrial Division to an investment group, which renamed it AccuTec Blades.
