= Safety razor =

Shaving implement

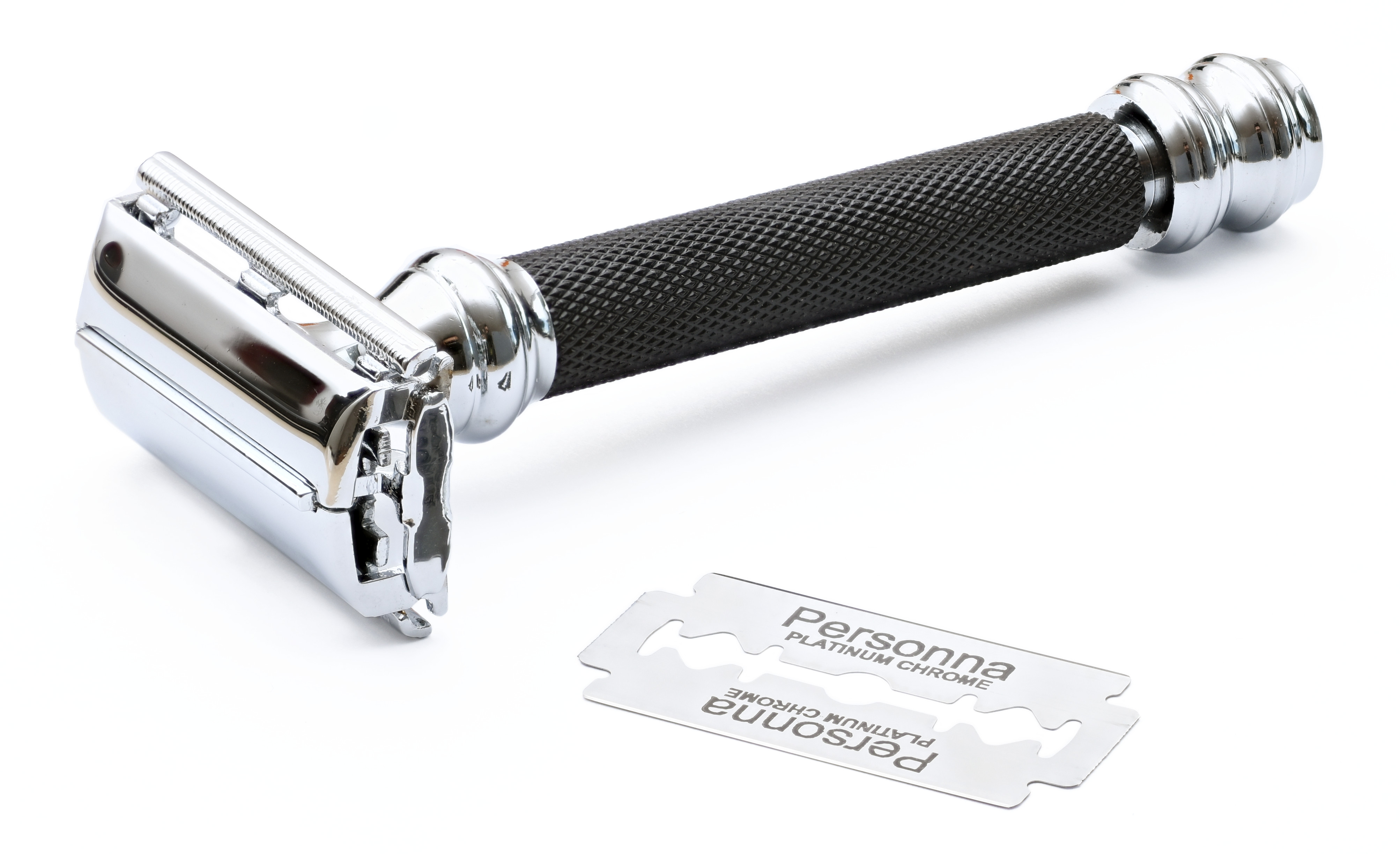
- Double-edge safety razor and blade
- Classification: Personal grooming device
- Types: single-edge safety razor; double-edge safety razor; cartridge razor; disposable razor
- Used with: Shaving cream, shaving brush, shaving soap
- Inventor: Jean-Jacques Perret (straight razor guard); King C. Gillette (double-edge); Wilkinson Sword (cartridge); Société Bic (disposable)
- Related: Electric shaver, Straight razor

A safety razor is a shaving implement with a protective device positioned between the edge of the blade and the skin. The initial purpose of these protective devices was to reduce the level of skill needed for injury-free shaving, thereby reducing the reliance on professional barbers.

Protective devices for razors have existed since at least the 1700s: a circa 1762 invention by the French cutler Jean-Jacques Perret added a protective guard to a regular straight razor. The first known occurrence of the term "safety razor" is found in a United States patent from 1880 for a razor in the basic contemporary configuration with a handle in which a removable blade is placed (although this form predated the patent).

Safety razors were popularized in the 1900s by King Camp Gillette's invention, the double-edge safety razor. While other safety razors of the time used blades that required stropping before use and after a time had to be honed by a cutler, Gillette's razor used a disposable blade with two sharpened edges. Gillette's invention became the predominant style of razor during and after the First World War, when the U.S. Army began issuing Gillette shaving kits to its servicemen.

Since their introduction in the 1970s, cartridge razors and disposable razors – where the blades are embedded in plastic – have become the predominant types of razors. In 2010, Procter & Gamble stated that almost a billion men were shaving with double-edge razors.

== History ==
=== Early designs ===
The first step towards a safer-to-use razor was the guard razor – also called a straight safety razor – which added a protective guard to a regular straight razor. The first such razor was most likely invented by French cutler Jean-Jacques Perret circa 1762. The invention was inspired by the joiner's plane and was essentially a straight razor with its blade surrounded by a wooden sleeve. The earliest razor guards had comb-like teeth and could only be attached to one side of a razor; a reversible guard was one of the first improvements made to guard razors.

The basic form of a razor, "the cutting blade of which is at right angles with the handle, and resembles somewhat the form of a common hoe", was first described in a patent application in 1847 by William S. Henson. This also covered a "comb tooth guard or protector" which could be attached both to the hoe form and to a conventional straight razor.

The first attested use of the term "safety razor" is in a patent application for "new and useful improvements in Safety-Razors", filed in May 1880 by Frederic and Otto Kampfe of Brooklyn, New York, and issued the following month. This differed from the Henson design in distancing the blade from the handle by interposing "a hollow metallic blade-holder having a preferably removable handle and a flat plate in front, to which the blade is attached by clips and a pivoted catch, said plate having bars or teeth at its lower edge, and the lower plate having an opening, for the purpose set forth", which is to "insure a smooth bearing for the plate upon the skin, while the teeth or bars will yield sufficiently to allow the razor to sever the hair without danger of cutting the skin." The Kampfe Brothers produced razors under their own name following the 1880 patent and improved the design in a series of subsequent patents. These models were manufactured under the "Star Safety Razor" brand.

A third pivotal innovation was a safety razor using a disposable double-edge blade for which King Camp Gillette submitted a patent application in 1901 and was granted in 1904. The Gillette Safety Razor Company was awarded a contract to supply the American troops in World War I with double-edge safety razors as part of their standard field kits (delivering a total of 3.5 million razors and 32 million blades for them). The returning soldiers were permitted to keep that part of their equipment and therefore retained their new shaving habits. The subsequent consumer demand for replacement blades put the shaving industry on course toward its present form with Gillette as a dominant force. Prior to the introduction of the disposable blade, users of safety razors still needed to strop and hone the edges of their blades. These are not trivial skills (honing frequently being left to a professional) and remained a barrier to the ubiquitous adopting of the "be your own barber" ideal.

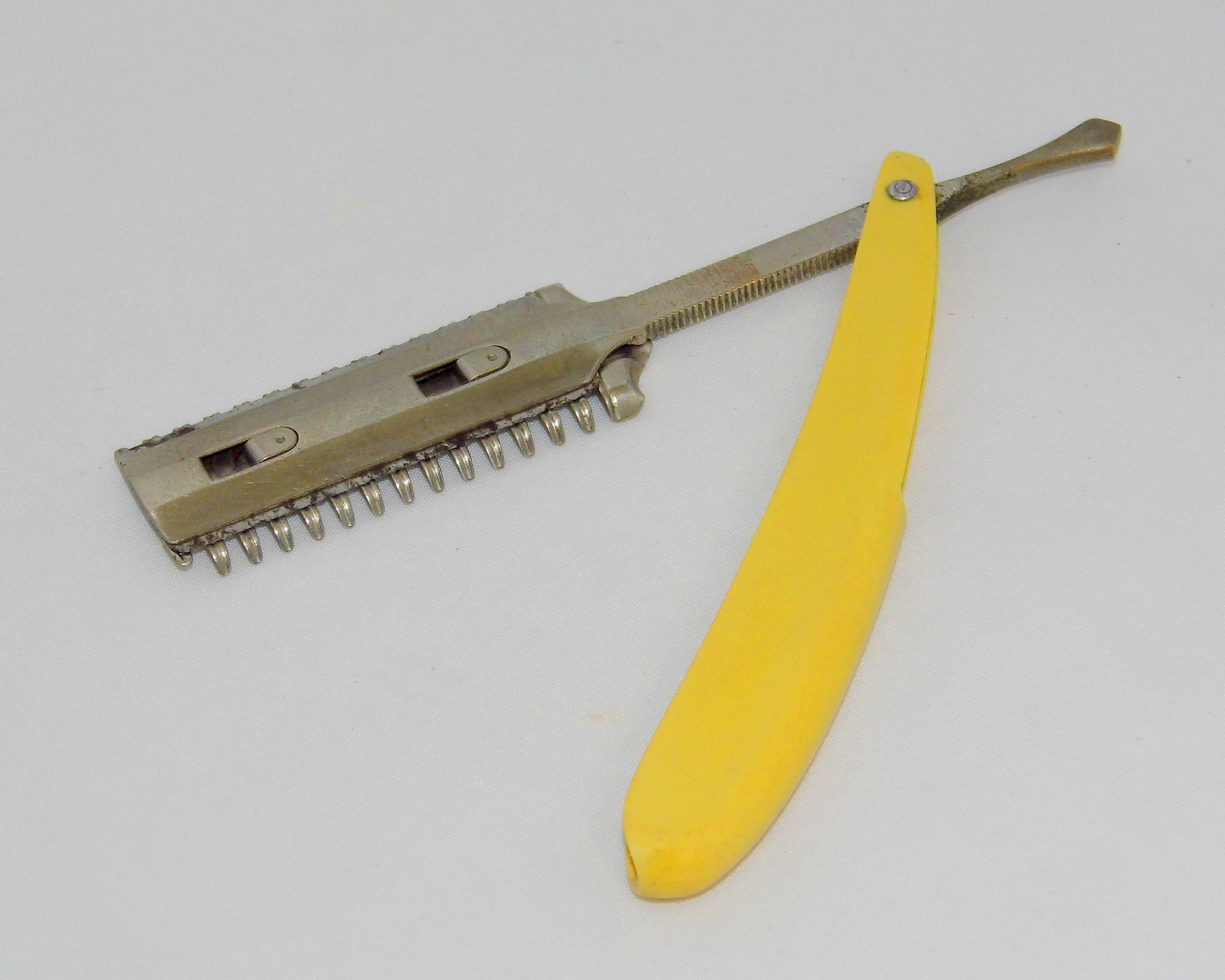
A straight razor that uses exchangeable blades (shavette) with a protective guard

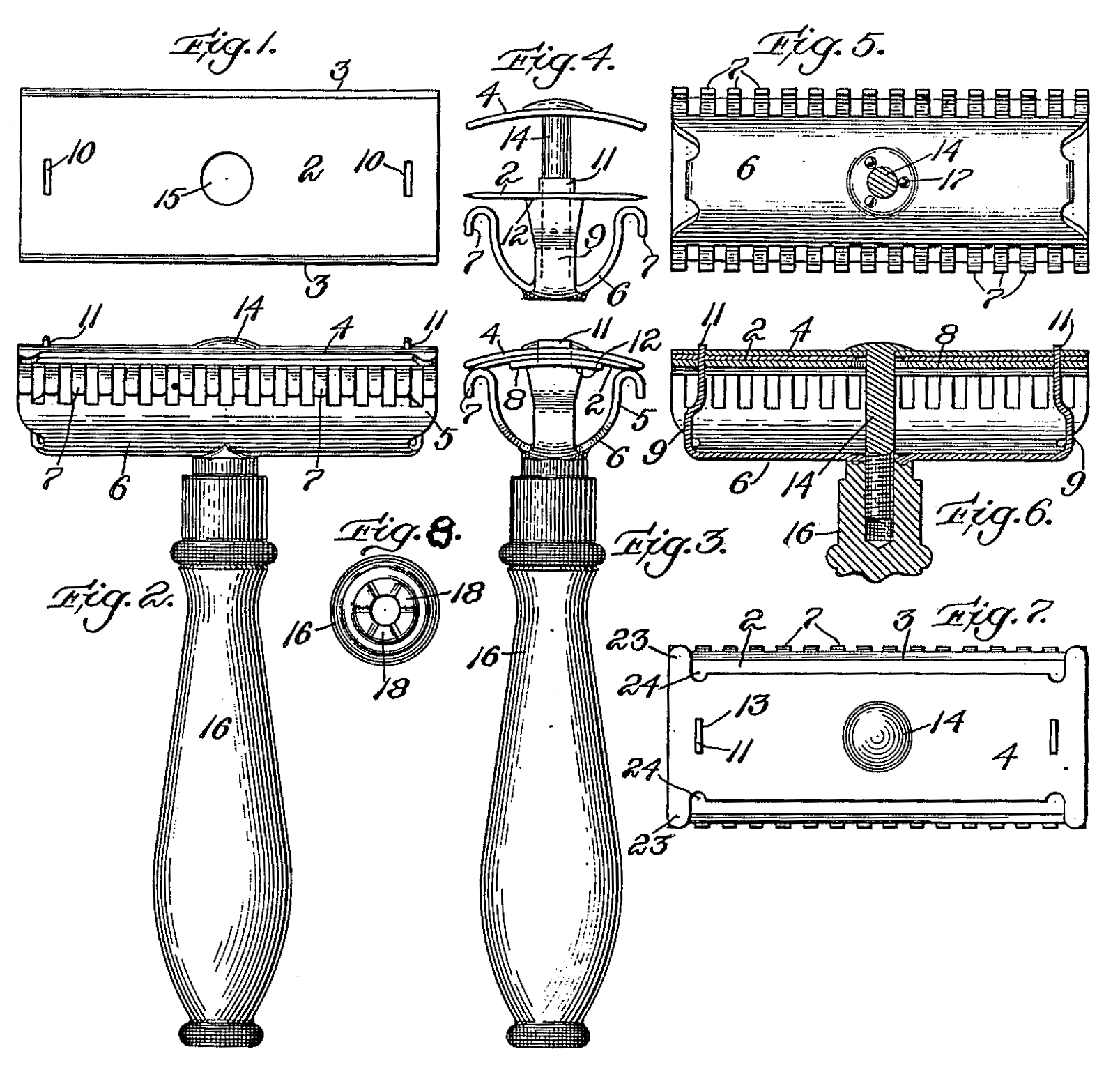
Gillette safety-razor patent drawing

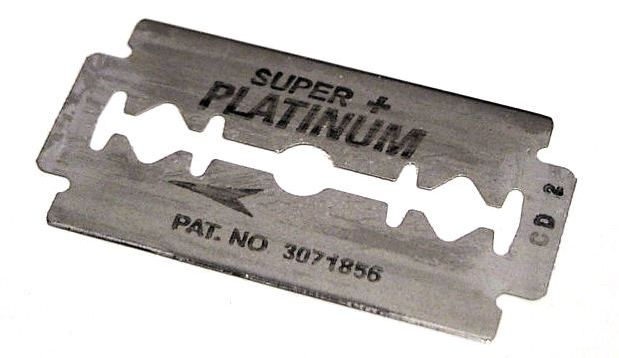
A modern double-edge safety razor blade

=== Single-edge razors ===
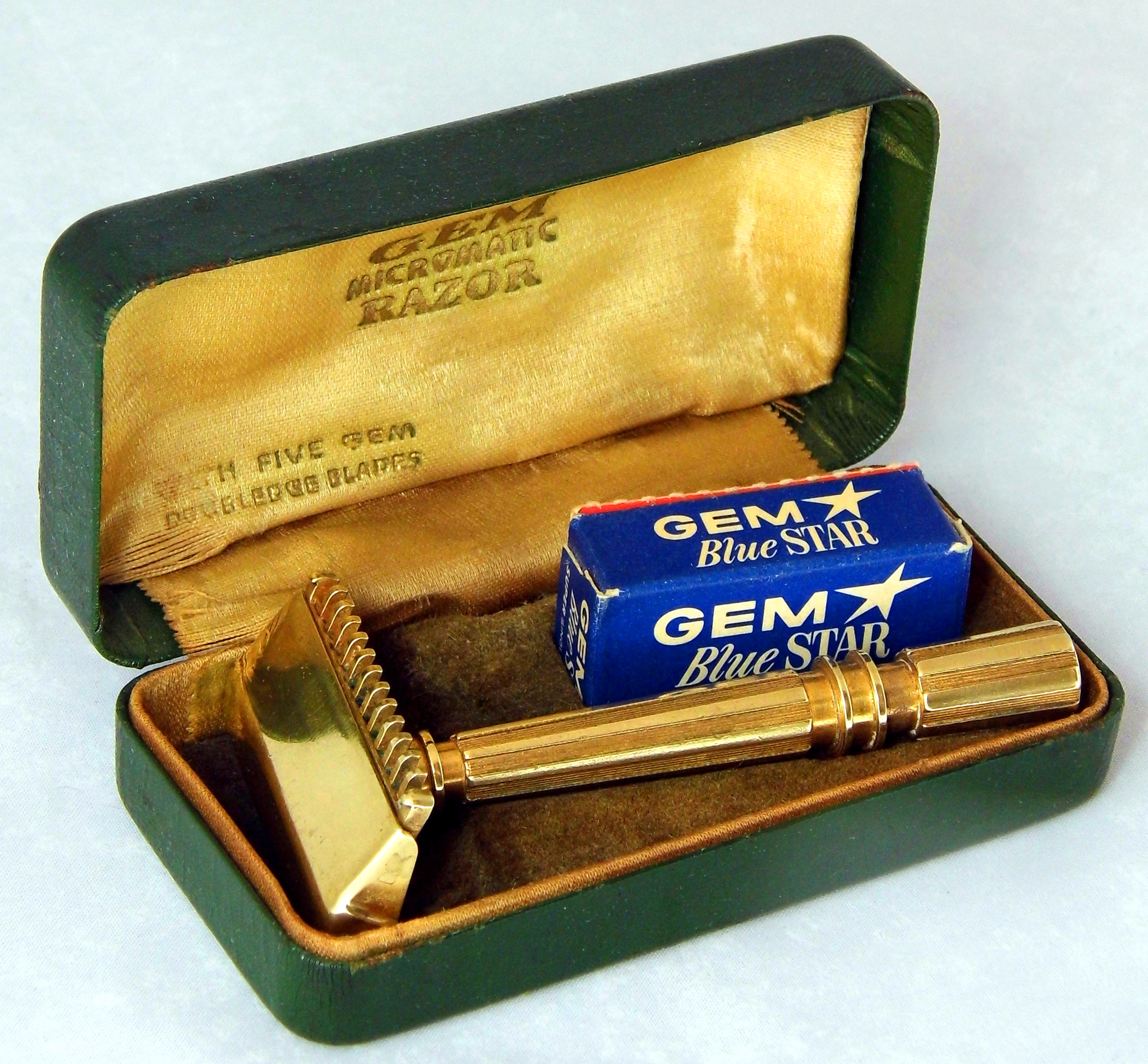
A Gem Micromatic single-edge razor and a packet of blades

The first safety razors used a single-edge blade that was essentially a 4 cm (1.6 in) long segment of a straight razor. A flat blade that could be used alternately with this "wedge" was first illustrated in a patent issued in 1878, serving as a close prototype for the single-edge blade in its present form. New single-edge razors were developed and used side by side with double-edge razors for decades. The largest manufacturers were the American Safety Razor Company with its "Ever-Ready" series, and the Gem Cutlery Company with its "Gem" models. Although these brands of single-edge razors are no longer in production, they are readily available in antique trade, and compatible modern designs are being made. Blades for them are still being manufactured both for shaving and technical purposes.

A second popular single-edge design is the "Injector" razor developed and placed on the market by Schick Razors in the 1920s. This uses narrow blades stored in an injector device with which they are inserted directly into the razor, so that the user never needs to handle the blade. The injector blade was the first to depart from the rectangular dimensions shared by the wedge, standard single-edge, and double-edge blades. The injector, itself, was also the first device intended to reduce the risk of injury from handling blades. The Gillette blade dispenser released in 1947 had the same purpose. The narrow injector blade, as well as the form of the injector razor, also strongly influenced the corresponding details of the subsequently developed cartridge razors. Both injector blades and injector safety razors are still available on the market, from antique stock as well as modern manufacture. The injector blades have also inspired a variety of specialised blades for professional barber use, some of which have been re-adopted for shaving by modern designs.

Until the 1960s, razor blades were made of carbon steel. These were extremely prone to rusting and forced users to change blades frequently. In 1962, the British company Wilkinson Sword began to sell blades made of stainless steel, whose edge did not corrode nearly so quickly and could be used far longer. Wilkinson quickly captured U.S., British and European markets. As a result, American Safety Razor, Gillette and Schick were driven to produce stainless steel blades to compete. Today, almost all razor blades are stainless steel, although carbon steel blades remain in limited production for lower income markets. Because Gillette held a patent on stainless blades but had not acted on it, the company was accused of exploiting customers by forcing them to buy the rust-prone blade.

The risk of injury from handling razor blades was further reduced in 1970 when Wilkinson released its "Bonded Shaving System", which embedded a single blade in a disposable polymer plastic cartridge. A flurry of competing models soon followed with everything from one to six blades, with many cartridge blade razors also having disposable handles. Cartridge blade razors are sometimes considered to be a generic category of their own and not a variety of safety razor. The similarities between single-edge cartridge blade razors and the classic injector razor do, however, provide equal justification for treating both categories contiguously.

In 1974, Bic introduced the disposable razor. Instead of being a razor with a disposable blade, the entire razor was manufactured to be disposable. Gillette's response was the Good News disposable razor which was launched on the US market in 1976 before the Bic disposable was made available on that market. Shortly thereafter, Gillette modified the Good News construction to add an aloe strip above the razor, resulting in the Good News Plus. The purported benefit of the aloe strip is to ease any discomfort felt on the face while shaving.

In direct response to Wilkinson's Bonded cartridge, during the following year Gillette introduced the twin-blade Trac II. They claimed that research showed the tandem action of the two blades to give a closer shave than a single blade, because of a "hysteresis" effect. In addition to the cutting action of the first blade, it is also supposed to pull the hair out of the follicle into which it does not fully retract before the second blade cuts it further. The extent to which this is of practical consequence has, however, been questioned.

=== Recent changes ===
Gillette introduced the first triple-blade cartridge razor, the Mach3, in 1998, and later upgraded the Sensor cartridge to the Sensor3 by adding a third blade. Schick/Wilkinson responded to the Mach3 with the Quattro, the first four-blade cartridge razor. These innovations are marketed with the message that they help consumers achieve the best shave as easily as possible. Another impetus for the sale of multiple-blade cartridges is that they have high profit margins. With manufacturers frequently updating their shaving systems, consumers can become locked into buying their proprietary cartridges, for as long as the manufacturer continues to make them. Subsequent to introducing the higher-priced Mach3 in 1998, Gillette's blade sales realized a 50% increase, and profits increased in an otherwise mature market.

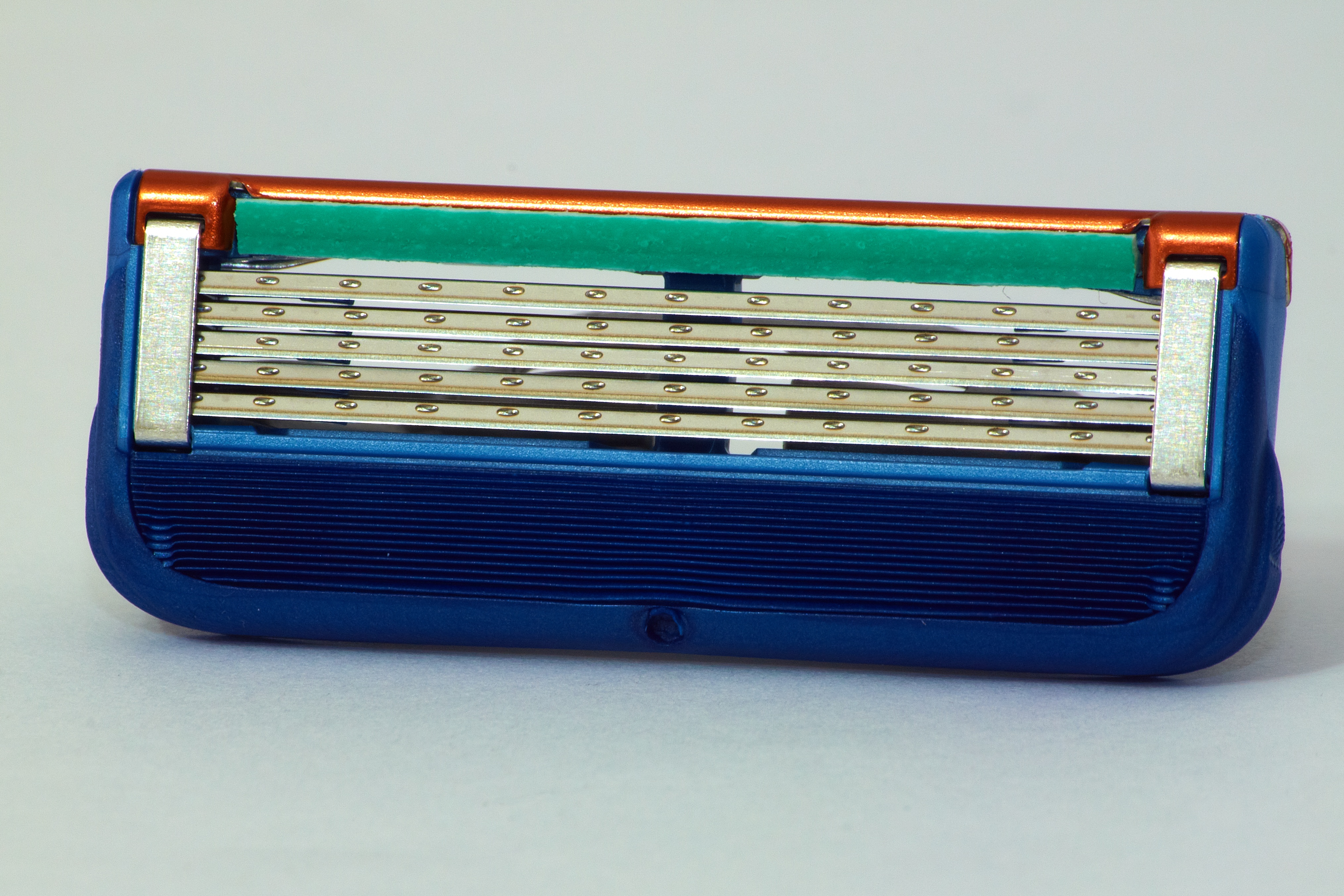
Gillette Fusion five-blade cartridge

The marketing of increasing numbers of blades in a cartridge has been parodied since the 1970s. The debut episode of Saturday Night Live in 1975 included a parody advertisement for the Triple Trac Razor, shortly after the first two-blade cartridge for men's razors was advertised. Mad magazine announced the "Trac 76", arranged as a chain of cartridges with a handle on each end. In the early 1990s, the (Australian) Late Show skitted a "Gillette 3000" with 16 blades and 75 lubricating strips as arrived at by working in conjunction with the help of NASA scientists - "The first blade distracts the hair...". The 16 January 1999 episode of Mad TV ran a parody commercial advertising the "Spishak Mach 20" with blades that variously "cut(s) away that pesky second layer of skin" and "gently smooth(s) out the jawbone" culminating in a blade that "destroys the part of the brain responsible for hair growth." In 2004, a satirical article in The Onion entitled "Fuck Everything, We're Doing Five Blades" predicted the release of five-blade cartridges, two years before their commercial introduction. South Korean manufacturer Dorco released their own six-blade cartridge in 2012, and later released a seven-blade cartridge.

Gillette has also produced powered variants of the Mach3 (M3Power, M3Power Nitro) and Fusion (Fusion Power and Fusion Power Phantom) razors. These razors accept a single AAA battery which is used to produce vibration in the razor; this action was purported to raise hair up and away from the skin prior to being cut. These claims were ruled in an American court as "unsubstantiated and inaccurate".

== Design ==
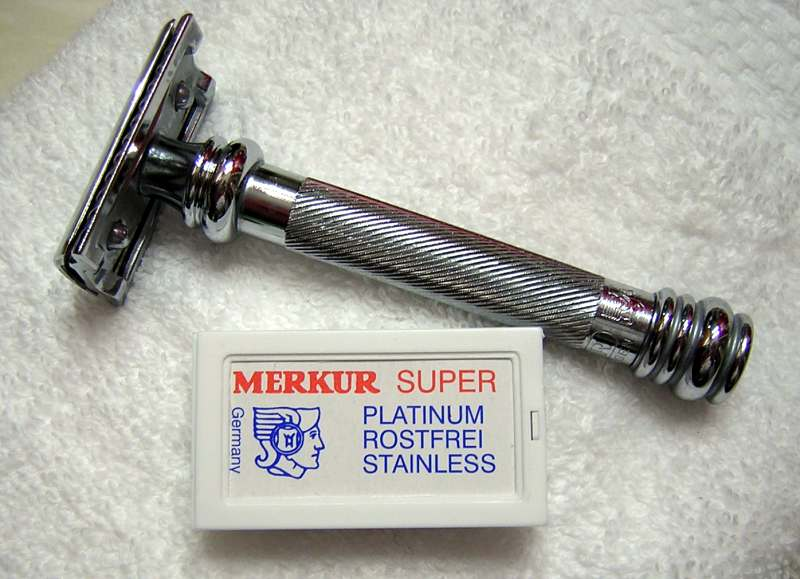
A Merkur 38C double-edge safety razor with a package of platinum stainless blades

Safety razors originally had an edge protected by a comb patterned on various types of protective guards that had been affixed to open-blade straight razors during the preceding decades.

== Lifespan ==
To maintain their cutting action, razor blades can be stropped using an old strip of denim. Twinplex also sold a blade stropper which was used to extend the life of vintage carbon steel blades.

Safety razor blades are usually made of razor steel which is a low chromium stainless steel which can be made extremely sharp, but corrodes relatively easily. Safety razor blade life may be extended by drying the blades after use. Salts from human skin also tend to corrode the blades, but washing and carefully drying them can greatly extend their life.

Disposable safety razor blades can be sharpened using various methods. There are commercial devices intended for this duty (Razormate, RazorPit, Blade Buddy, etc.).

== Variants ==
=== Double-edged razors ===
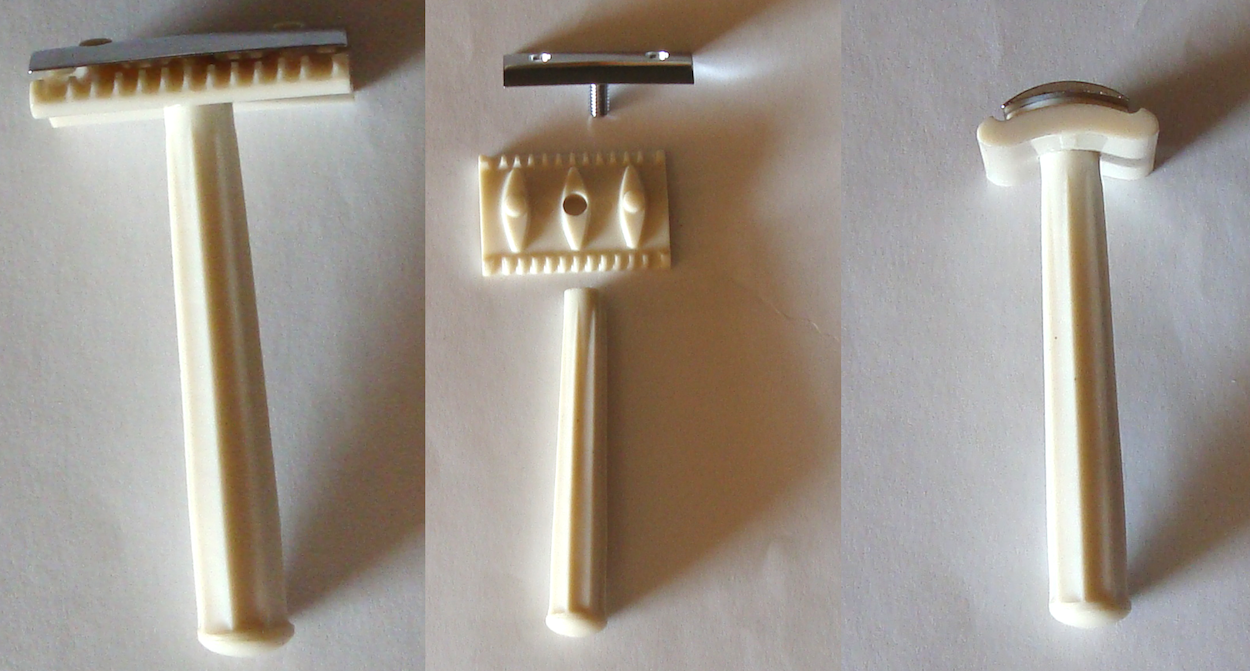
A three-piece British 'knockout' safety razor made from Bakelite and steel, probably from between 1930s–1950s

Double-edge (DE) safety razors remain a popular alternative to proprietary cartridge razors, and usually offer significantly lower total cost of ownership since they are not marketed under the "razor and blades business model". Double-edge razors are still designed and produced in many countries, and in 2010, Procter & Gamble estimated that almost a billion men were shaving with double-edge razors. Better known manufacturers include Edwin Jagger, Feather, iKon, Lord, Mühle, Merkur, and Weishi, with several of them producing razors that are marketed under other brands. Often different models of razors within a brand share the same razor-head designs, differing primarily in the color, length, texture, material(s), and weight of the handles. Three-piece razors generally have interchangeable handles, and some companies specialize in manufacturing custom or high-end replacement handles. The butterfly safety razor utilizes a twist-to-open mechanism head to make changing the blade easy and convenient. Variations in razor head designs include straight safety bar (SB), open comb (OC)(toothed) bar, adjustable razors, and slant bar razors. The slant bar was a common design in Germany in which the blade is slightly angled and curved along its length to make for a slicing action and a more rigid cutting edge.

A primary functional difference between double-edge razors and modern cartridge razors is that DE razor heads come in a wide array of aggression levels (where aggression is commonly defined as being less protection from the blade).
