= R. A. Rooney & Sons =

R. A. Rooney & Sons Ltd. was a maker of shaving brushes, with over 200 years in business both in the UK and overseas (plus more than a century in Galway, Ireland). The exact origin of this company is unknown because of a huge fire in 1886 at their Bishopsgate plant that destroyed most of their old records. In 1901, it moved from London to Higham Hill Road.

Rooney, now called The City of London Brushworks, offers both machine-made and handmade brushes. Many of their bristle buyers and bristle dressers have been with the company for over 50 years.
