= Shaving soap =

Hard soap that is used to produce lather with a shaving brush

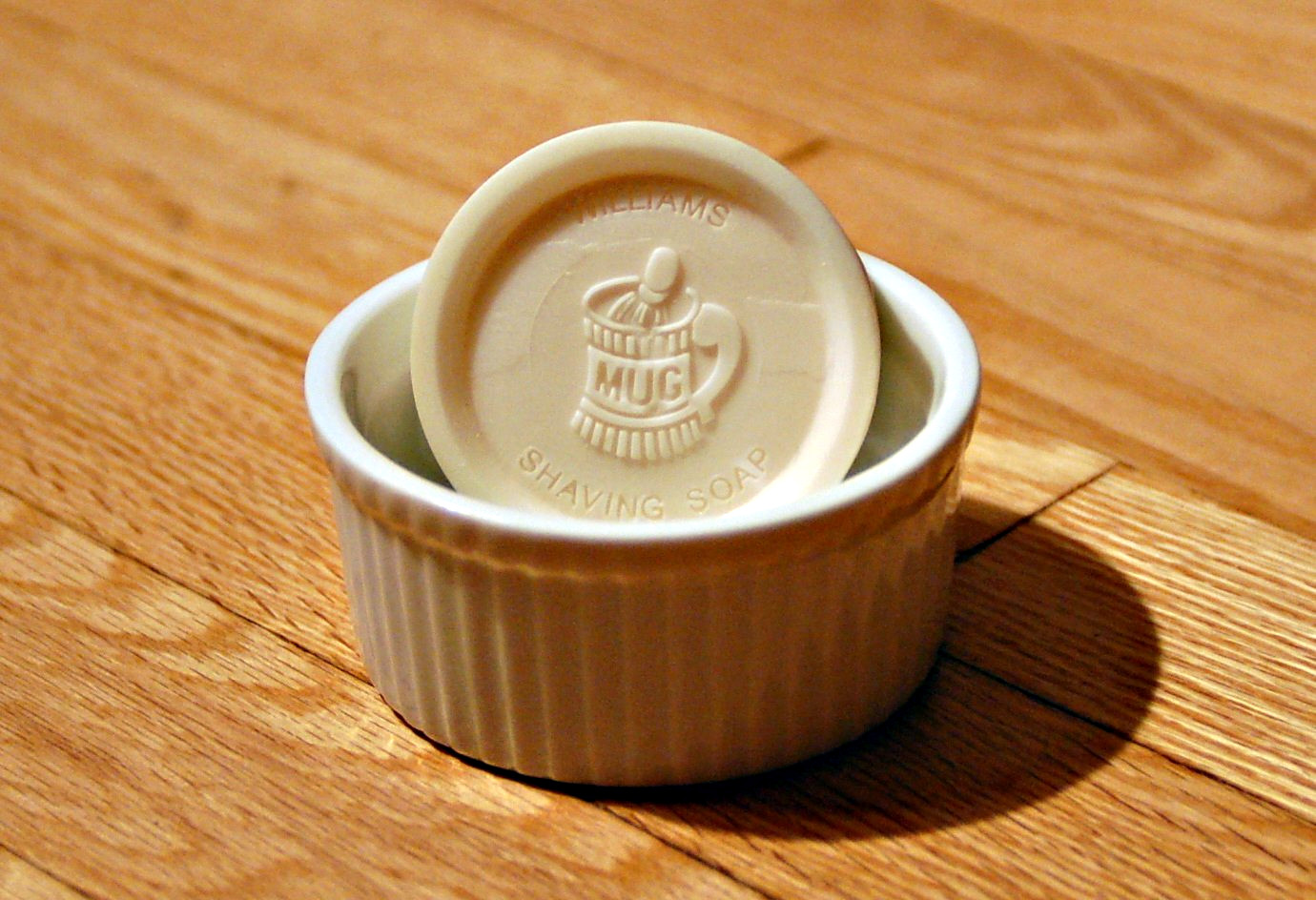
A puck of shaving soap in a ceramic bowl

Shaving soap (sometimes called a shaving puck) is a hard soap that is used to produce lather with a shaving brush. The lather it produces is used to coat the face during shaving, softening the hair in preparation for shaving.

While shaving soap produces plenty of dense and long-lasting lather, its use in modern times is less widespread and has been overtaken by various types of shaving cream.

== History ==
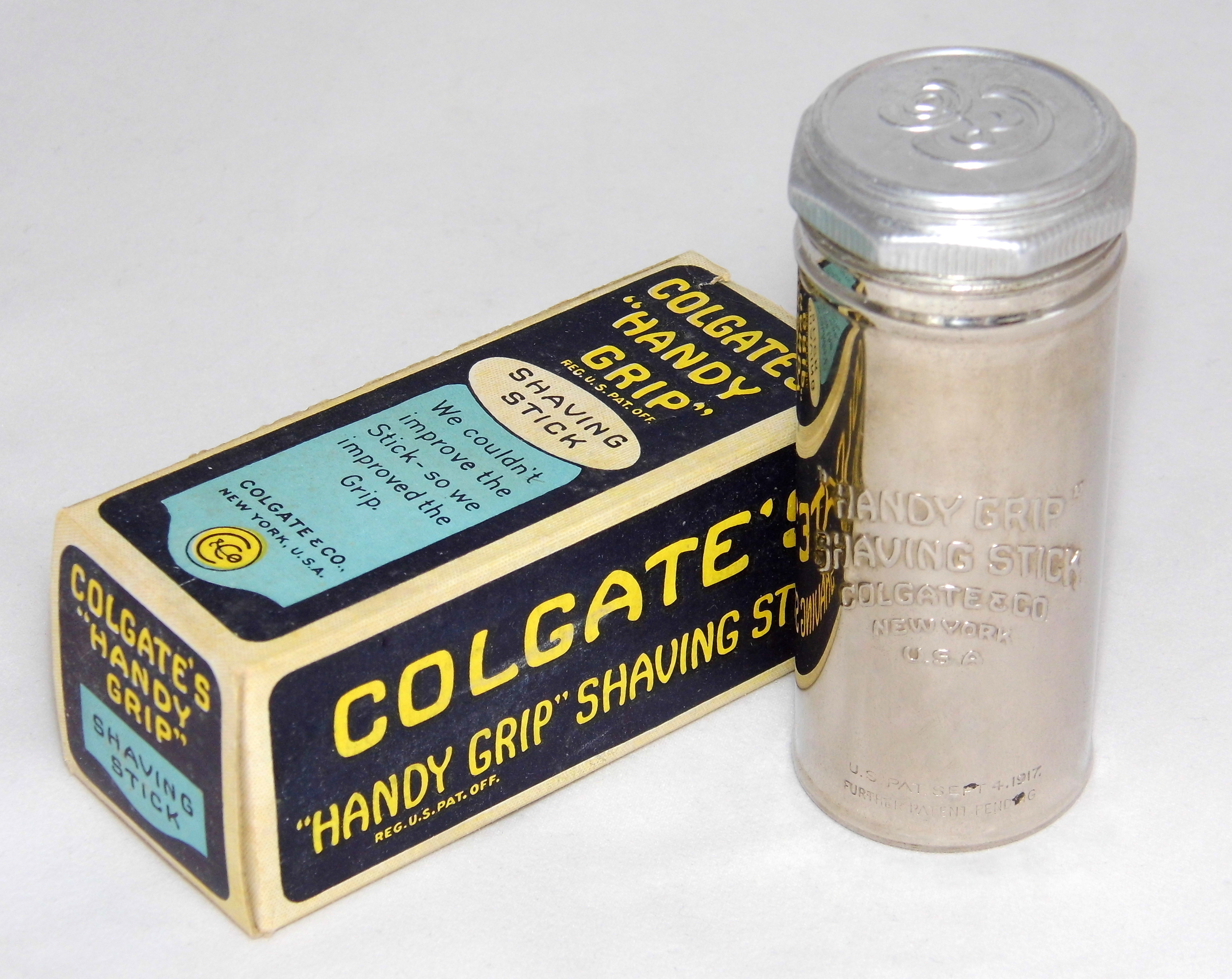
Colgate shaving soap stick container from the 1930s

Hard shaving soaps in their modern form have existed since at least the early 19th century. Williams (a common American shaving soap intended for use in a mug rather than a scuttle) has been produced since 1840, and a United States patent for a shaving scuttle for use with a hard soap was granted in 1867. Shaving sticks (shaving soap formed into a cylinder) have existed at least since the mid-19th century.

The 21st century has seen a pop culture renaissance of wet shaving and thus, shaving soaps have become increasingly popular, with multiple brands being established to exclusively sell the product.

== Appearance ==
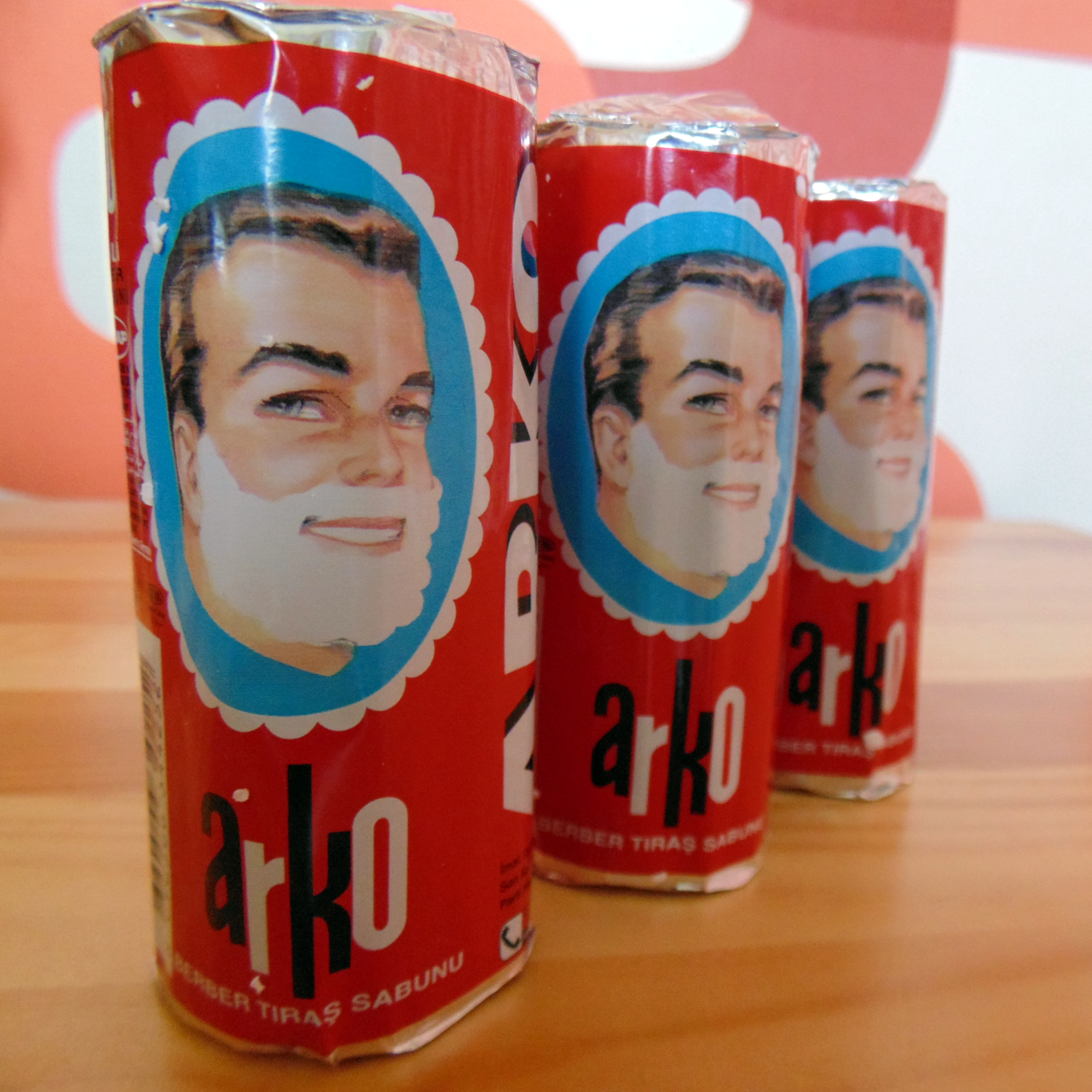
Shave sticks packaged in foil and paper.

Traditional shaving soap is often sold as a round puck, either with a rounded bottom intended for use with a shaving scuttle or a flat bottom for use in a mug. High-end soaps may be sold with their own dishes, typically made of either wood or ceramic, and be formed to fit the dish with which the puck is sold. Shaving soap may also be formed in a stick, sold either in a plastic tube or wrapped in foil or paper. Shaving soap is more rarely sold as rectangular bars (as is common with body soap).

== Use ==
A hard shaving soap is used with a shaving brush to create lather for shaving. For soap in the form of a puck or bar, the brush is first soaked in water and then swirled vigorously over the surface of the soap, causing moist soap to coat the brush's bristles. The brush is then transferred either to a separate bowl or to the shaver's face to be lathered.

Shaving sticks are typically used by rubbing the exposed end of the stick across the shaver's face, coating the face with soap. The soap is then lathered with a moistened brush. Owing to their compact form and ease of use, shaving sticks are popular for use while traveling.

== Ingredients ==
Shaving soap is produced like a traditional soap with an ingredient selection oriented to producing a stable, slick lather. Its manufacture often differs slightly from normal bath soap in that both potassium hydroxide and sodium hydroxide may be used as saponification agents. Sodium hydroxide creates a harder soap, such as is used in pucks, whereas potassium hydroxide facilitates creation of a softer soap, which loads on the brush more easily. Historically, tallow has been a popular ingredient in shaving soaps and is still in use in some traditional products. Palm oil is frequently used as a substitute for tallow where animal fats are not desired. Other oils such as coconut oil are commonly used. Component fatty acids, such as stearic acid, are also used in shaving soaps for the properties which they contribute; stearic acid contributes to a more stable, dense lather.

== Advantages and disadvantages ==
The primary advantages of shaving soap over aerosol shaving creams is the additional hydration provided by shaving soaps.

Shaving soaps are also approved by the Transportation Security Administration and other airport security agencies as permitted in carry-on luggage. There is furthermore little risk of accidental discharge of the product during transport.

The principal disadvantages of shaving soap is lack of convenience and space. Creating the lather and preparing the face is more time-consuming than with other shaving creams. In addition, use of a shaving mug and optionally a lather bowl, consumes more space and takes more time than most shaving creams do. Some people choose to dispense with the mug and bowl and build up the lather from shave soap directly on the skin of the face.

Shaving soaps typically cost more initially, when the shaving mug and soap is purchased. These costs can be significantly reduced by using mugs and bowls found in the kitchen, or purchased for a small amount at resale stores. Even though shaving soaps may cost more initially when buying the soap and equipment, over a longer period of time, shaving soaps are comparable in cost, or even cheaper than many shaving creams. Furthermore, shaving soaps have less ecological impact with respect to aerosol shaving creams.

== See also ==
- Aftershave
- Barber
- Bay rum
- Beard
- Burma-Shave
- Eau de Cologne
- Head shaving
- Leg shaving
- List of cleaning products
- Razors
- Saltwater soap
- Shaving cream
- Straight razor
