= Shaving brush =

Tool to make and apply shaving soap or cream

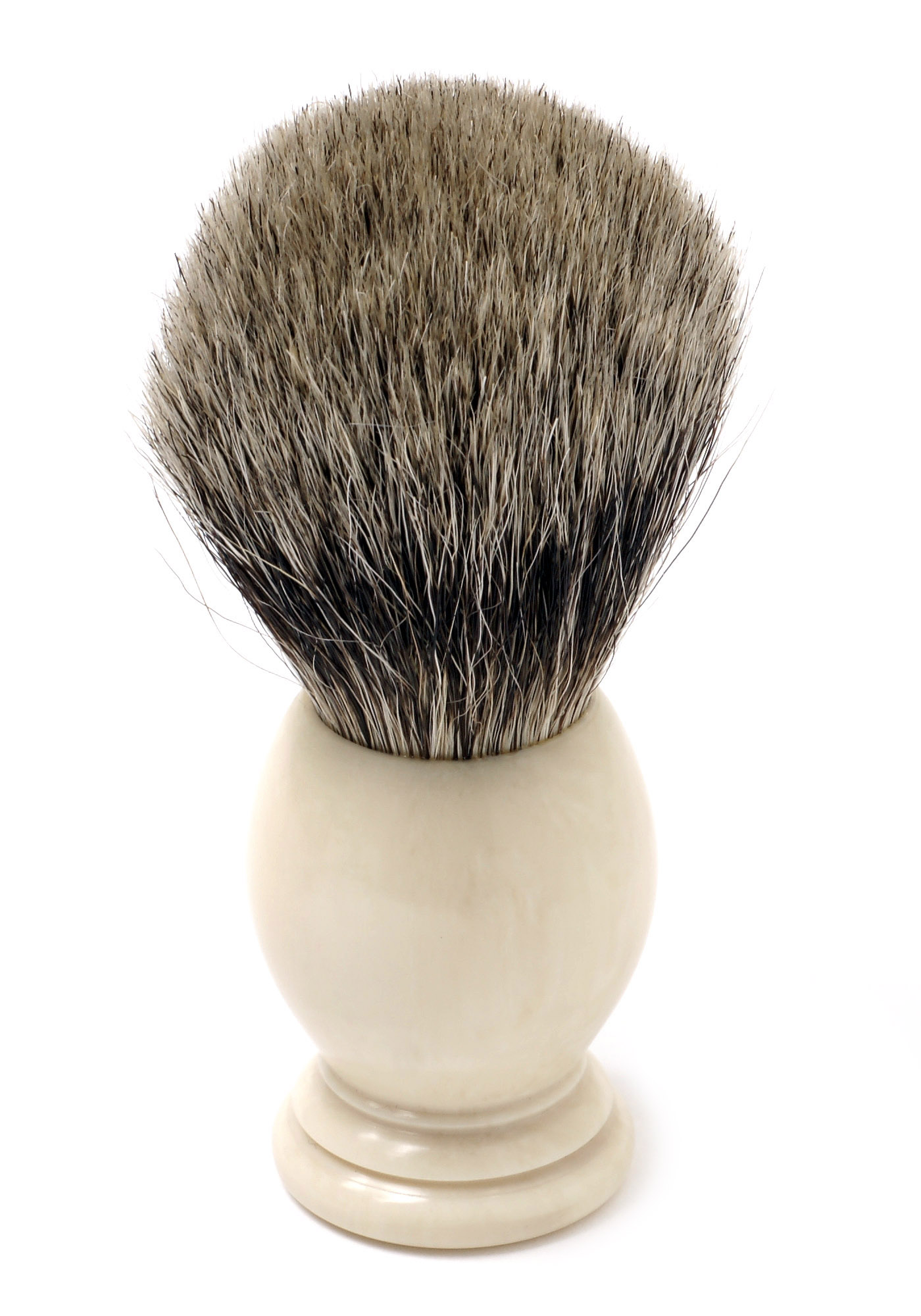
- Other names: Shave brush
- Classification: Personal grooming tool
- Types: Types of hair used: synthetic; boar; badger; horse
- Used with: Shaving soap, shaving cream, straight razor, safety razor

A shaving brush or shave brush is a small brush with a handle parallel to the bristles used to make lather from shaving soap or shaving cream and apply it to the face when shaving. Shave brushes are often decorative; antique handles are often made from materials such as ivory or even gold, though the bristle load may be composed of any number of natural or synthetic materials. The shave brush is used most often today by "wet shavers" in tandem with a single- or double-edged safety razor or a straight razor. However, this is not always the case, as shavers of all varieties may employ the tool.

== History ==
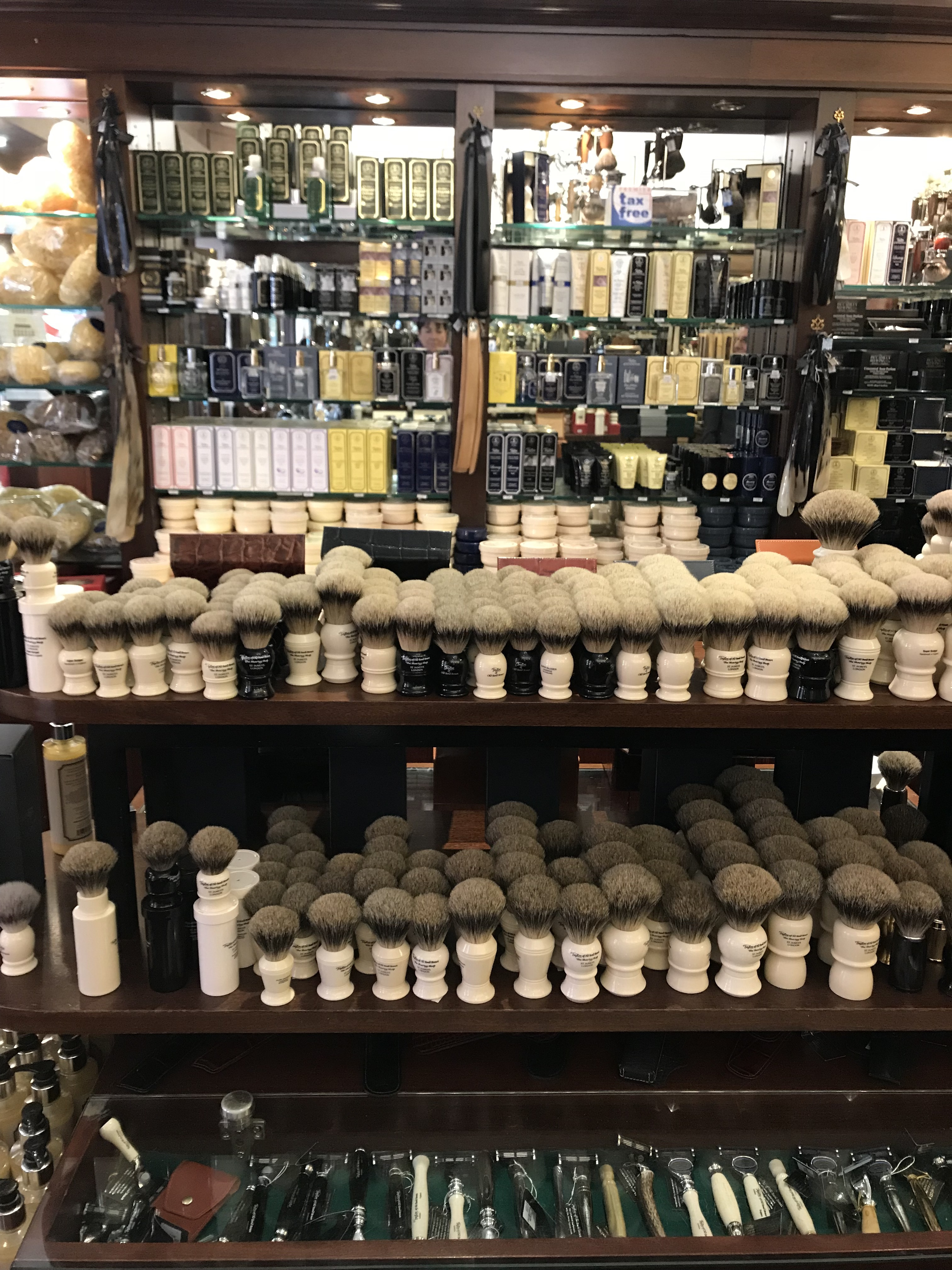
Shaving brushes in a barber supply shop in London.

The modern shaving brush may be traced to France during the 1750s. The French call a shaving brush blaireau or "badger, because high-end brushes use badger hair." Quality of these brushes differed greatly, as materials used to fashion the handles varied from the common to the exotic. It was not uncommon for handles to be made of ivory, gold, silver, tortoiseshell, crystal, or porcelain. The more expensive brushes used badger hair, with cheaper ones using boar's or horse's hair. In the 1800s, the folding-handle straight razor design made it practical for men to shave themselves rather than visit a barber. A shave brush became a status symbol, and an expensive or eccentric brush was a way of asserting one's personality or even affluence. The recent rapid rise in the popularity of "wet shaving" has raised demand for high-quality and custom shaving brushes.

== Shave brush handles ==
Modern shave brushes are similar in appearance, composition and function to their centuries-old predecessors. Although a variety of different materials are still used to fashion shave brush handles, synthetic handles of nylon, urethane or plastic are the most common even with the most expensive shave brush manufacturers. Benefits of synthetic handles include a lesser chance of breakage and resistance to damage by moisture. A limited number of consumers prefer natural materials such as wood or exotic materials such as tortoiseshell. A shave brush's handle, regardless of its material composition, rarely affects the overall performance of the brush.

== Bristle knot ==
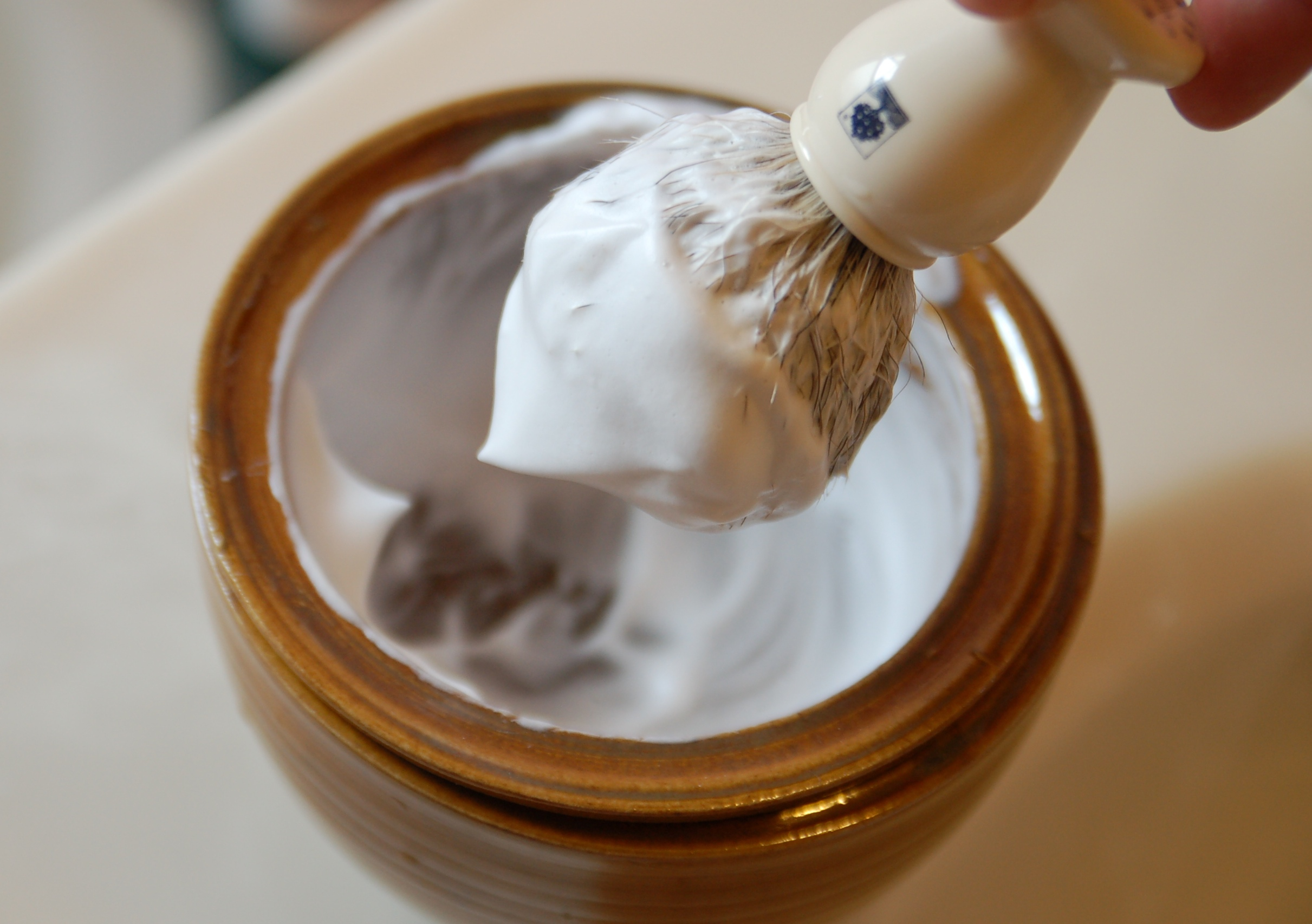
Soft soap is worked into a foam by vigorously working the soap with a wet brush and then applied to the face or other area to be shaved.

A shave brush's price is usually determined more by its bristle load than any other factor, except for brushes with exotic handles. The most expensive brushes often use exotic materials in the handle. The bristles are fixed together into a knot that is installed into the handle. The best quality brushes are hand knotted. Badger and boar brushes are the most commonly found animals used for shaving brush fibers. Badger species include the Eurasian badger and the hog badger. Badger brushes are often referred to as two band, or three band. Perhaps all badger hair fibers have three bands, but those used in the brushes conceal the lighter bottom band. Nonetheless, both types of bristle make desirable shaving brushes. Lower-quality brushes are often machine made and the bristles may be trimmed, resulting in sharp, prickly tips.

Synthetic shave brushes, most often made using nylon bristles, are available in a range of prices and gradations in quality. Comparable to traditional shaving brushes, synthetic fiber brushes can quickly create a rich lather using relatively little shaving soap or cream. The synthetic fibers dry faster than natural hair and are less sensitive to everyday use.

Boar's hair brushes are relatively inexpensive, but can be of high quality. A well-made boar brush will break in with use; the bristles begin to split at their tips, resulting in a brush that is soft but has considerable backbone. Unlike badger hair and synthetic fibers, boar bristles absorb water, so the brush should be soaked before use.

Badger hair brushes come in a variety of grades, but there is not an industry standard that specifically defines grades of badger hair. Generally speaking, though, there are basic classifications that manufacturers use to describe the quality of hair used in their brushes. The most common gradations of badger hair are "pure" badger, "best" badger, and "super" or "silvertip" badger. While some companies insist on using other gradations (for example, Vulfix's high-end brushes distinguish between "super" and "silvertip"), these three are commonly accepted among wet shavers and are most often used to describe the quality of a shave brush.

=== Pure badger ===
Pure badger are badger hair brushes that use the most common hair from the underbelly of a badger, the hair which covers around 60% of a badger's body. This hair varies greatly in softness, pliability and color. Pure badger hair is usually dark in color, but fluctuates from a light tan to a near-black or silvery sheen. The hair is coarser than 'best' or 'silvertip' hair due to its larger shaft. Brushes made exclusively with pure badger hair cost significantly less than finer badger hair. Most often, pure badger brush hairs are trimmed to shape, resulting in somewhat stiff, rough ends.

=== Best badger ===
Best badger are brushes made with the finer and more pliable hairs from 20 - 25% of the badger's body. It is longer in length and lighter in color than 'pure' badger hair. A 'best' badger brush is more densely filled with hair than the 'pure' badger brush and will produce a correspondingly greater lather. However, some wet shavers argue that the variance between the quality of a 'pure' and a 'best' badger brush is negligible. Best badger and better quality brush hairs are often fit so that the ends do not have to be cut to shape.

=== Super badger ===
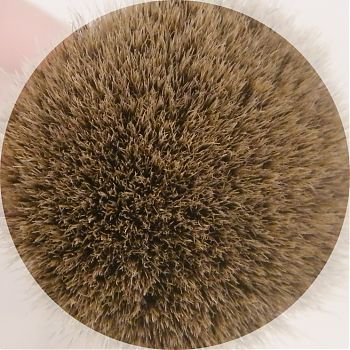
Super badger

A super badger brush is more expensive than either 'best' or 'pure'. While some call this hair 'silvertip', it is often highly graded 'pure' hair bleached on the ends to resemble silvertip.

Though it is composed of 'pure' badger hairs, 'super' is graded and sorted to such a degree that its performance is superior to that of 'best'. The brush is not prickly.

One way to determine if a brush bears a 'super' or 'silvertip' badger hair load is to look at the color of the bristle tips. A true 'silvertip' brush has tips that are an off-white. A 'super' brush on the other hand has bristle tips that are a more sterile, slightly greyed white; moreover, the light color of the tips does not extend as far down the shaft of the hair.

=== Silvertip badger ===
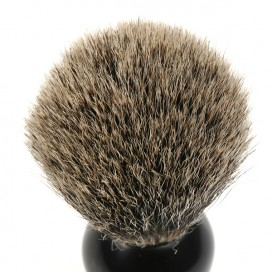
A silvertip badger hair brush

Silvertip badger is the most expensive and rare type of badger hair. The tips on this hair appear white naturally, without bleaching. A "flared" bristle load results in the 'silvertip' brush's fluffy appearance and lends the brush its ability to hold a large amount of water. Due to its water retention capacity, a 'silvertip' brush can create well-formed shaving lather quickly and easily.

Some manufacturers such as Plisson, Simpsons and Rooney sell shaving brushes in a grade beyond silvertip. While the names these companies give this 'extra silvertip' vary, the properties remain fairly consistent between manufacturers as compared to the 'ordinary silvertip' brush. These brushes differ in appearance (the tip is whiter and extends further down the shaft; additionally, the hair under the tip is pure black as opposed to dark grey in color) and feel (the extra silvertip feels slightly firmer and less "prickly" on the face when lathering).

Another feature that badger bristles may show are the so called “gel tips”, a combination of two distinct traits: a little “hook” in many hair tips and a gel, slick sensation of the knot tips when wet. When dry, the shaving brush knots with gel tips are not fully recognizable: the presence of little hooks is not sufficient to provide the second, and also most distinct trait: the “slick”, soapy feeling. The feeling of gel tips can be discerned pretty easily: once wet, the hair tips clump together in little groups and after lathering up, it will seems that the soap in the knot cannot be fully rinsed away. There is no standard for this feature, so every person will have to feel it himself, especially when rubbing the wet shaving brush knot near the lips, where the skin is more sensitive.

== Sources of brush hair ==
North American badger hair is not appropriate for shaving brushes. Commercial badger hair comes from mainland China, which supplies knots of hair in various grades to brush makers in both China and Europe. In rural areas, badgers multiply to the point of becoming a crop nuisance, and village cooperatives are licensed by the national government to hunt badgers and sell the hair to processors. Procter & Gamble stopped using badger hair in its Art of Shaving products following a PETA investigation of several badger-hair farms and brush-making factories in Shijiazhuang, China, and a video that showed a worker beating a badger with a chair leg before slaughtering it for its fur.

Boar bristles are available cheaply from a number of sources. Brushes made in China or India with boar bristle are supplied wholesale, while even the cheapest wholesale Badger brush costs at least $10; even the cost difference between badger brushes with resin handles vs. expensive horn handles shows that, except with exotic materials such as sterling silver, special woods, ivory, bone or custom materials, badger hair is the costliest element of a brush. It is common for boar-hair brushes to have part of the bristles dyed to resemble badger hair.

Brushes with nylon-only bristles are available.

Horse hair brushes are coming back, after a hiatus of nearly 100 years following an anthrax scare around World War I. Material for horse hair shaving brushes is cut from the horse's mane or tail, and the animal is not harmed.

== Benefits of using a shaving brush ==
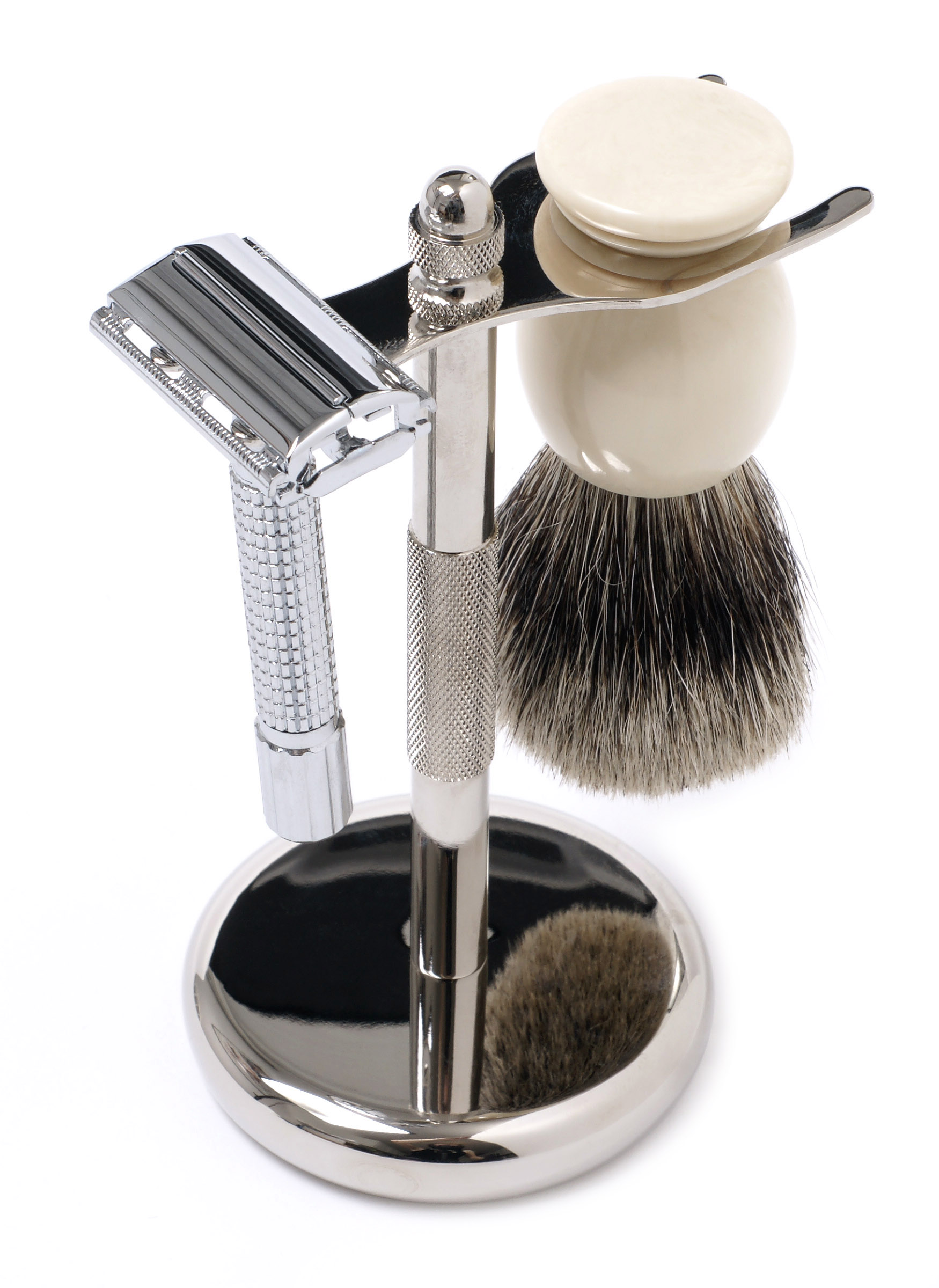
A shaving set with a razor and brush on a stand.

A fibrous bristle load holds significant amounts of water which mix with the soap lifted from a shaving mug or scuttle. The more water a brush holds, the moister and richer a lather will be. Thicker and more emollient lather translates to less razor skipping and dragging.

Bringing a shave brush across one's skin produces a mild exfoliation. Because a shave brush is most often used with a shave soap, this effect often replaces the pre-shave routine of washing and applying lotion to the face.

A shave brush also lifts facial hair before a shave, requiring less pressure from the razor.

== See also ==
- Aftershave
- Barber
- Bay rum
- Beard
- Burma-Shave
- Colognes
- Head shaving
- Leg shaving
- Razors
- Shaving cream
- Shaving soap
