= Bay rum =

Type of cologne and aftershave lotion

Bay rum is a type of cologne and aftershave lotion. Other uses include as under-arm deodorant, fragrance for shaving soap and hair cream, as well as a general astringent.

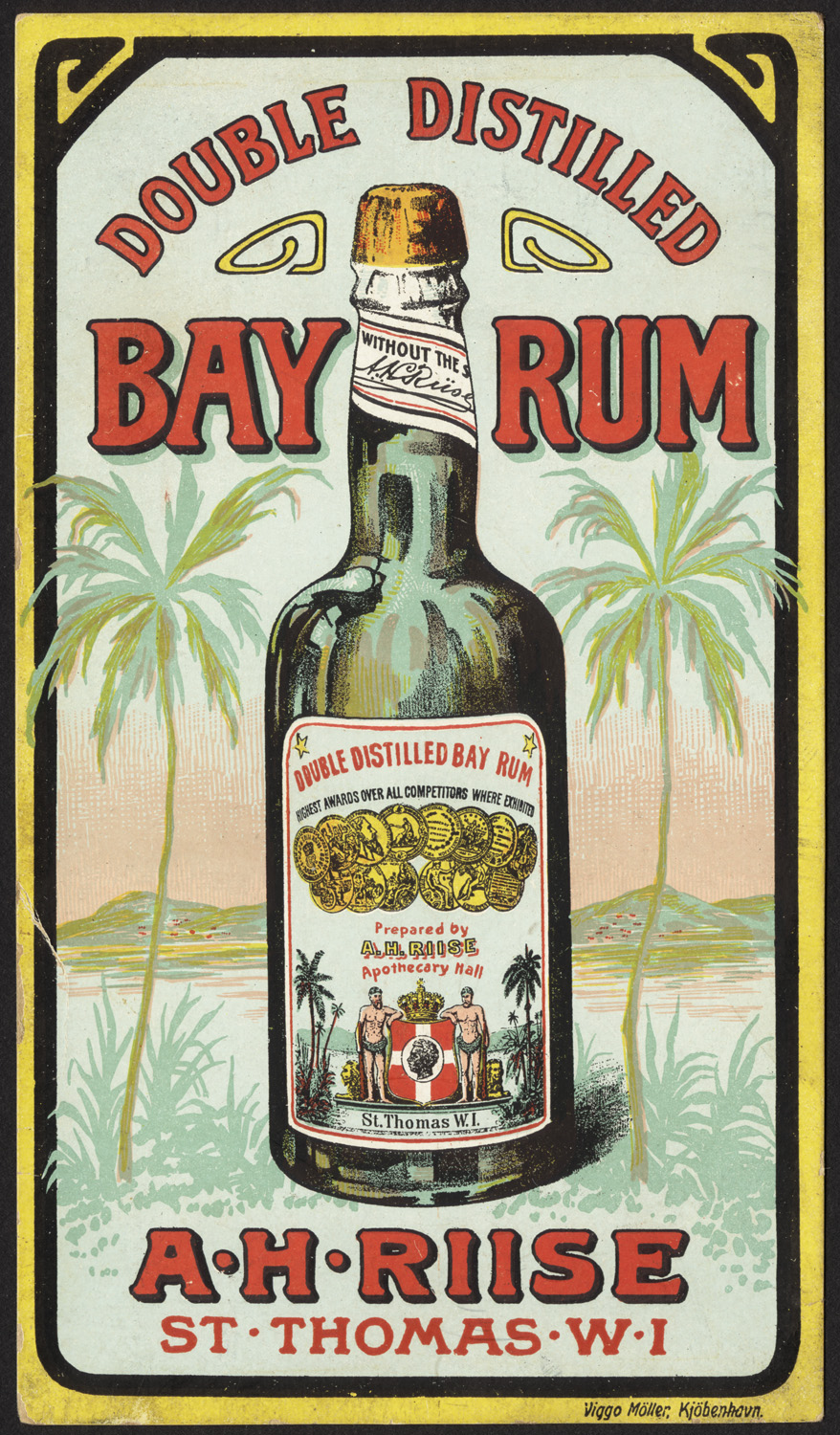
19th-century trade card, showing bay rum from St. Thomas.

== Origins ==
Bay rum is a distillate, originally made in Saint Thomas in the Danish West Indies (and probably in other West Indian islands) starting around 1840 from rum and the leaves and/or berries of the West Indian bay tree, Pimenta racemosa.

John Maisch identified the leaf in the herbarium at the Philadelphia Academy of Natural Sciences, collected in Saint Croix, "by the late Dr. Griffith", which was identified as Myrcia acris, now transferred to the genus Pimenta. Maisch added that it was "very probable that various species are made use of for the same purpose". An 1889 reference specifies that other ingredients may include citrus- and spice-oils, most commonly lime oil and oil of cloves. A drop of oil of cloves is added to two parts bay oil and one part pimento oil in one of two recipes for bay rum; the aromatics are steeped in alcohol and as a last step an equal part of "good rum" is added, and cinnamon.

== Popularity ==
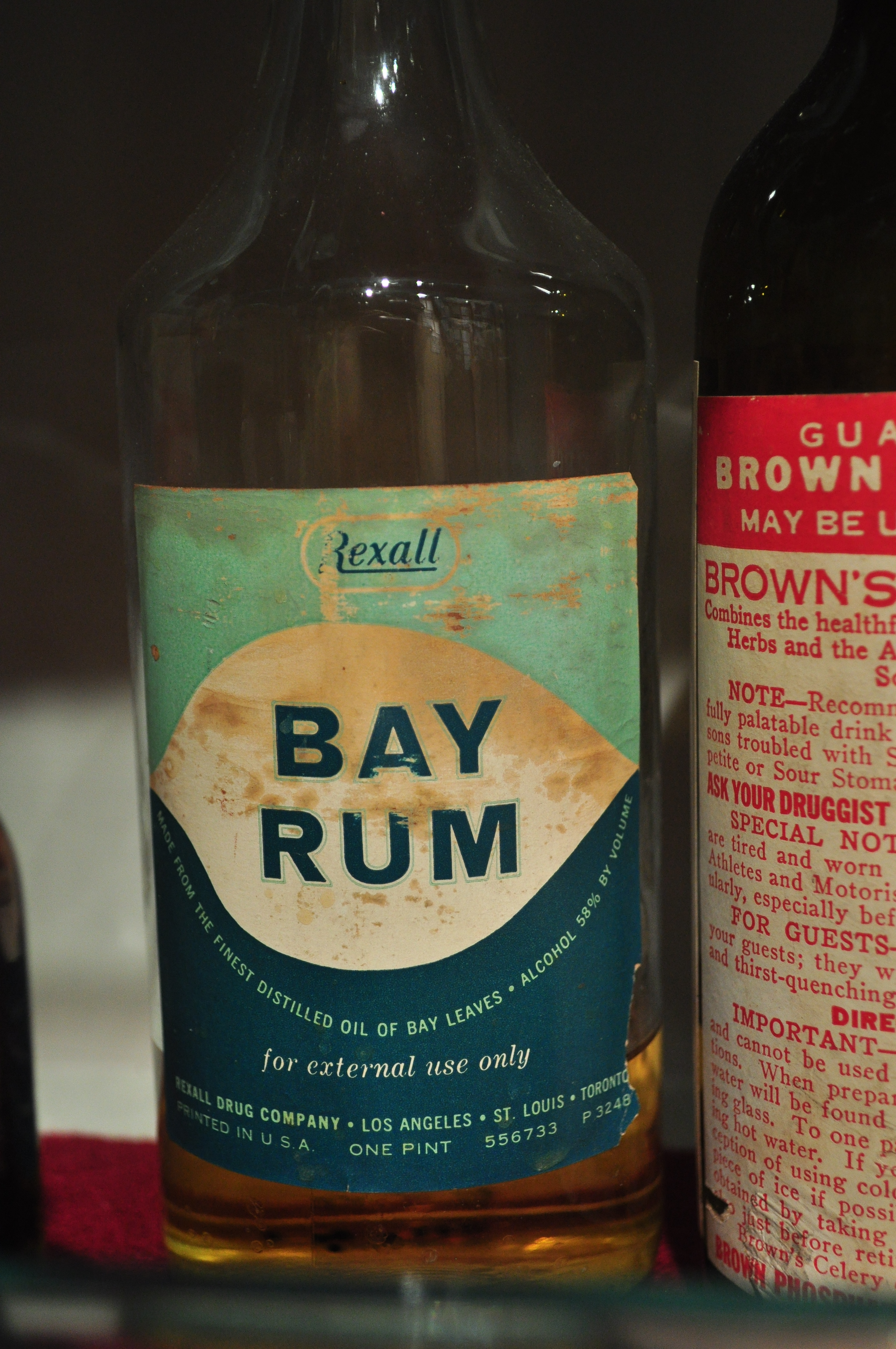
At 58% alcohol by volume and despite "for external use only" indications, Rexall Bay Rum was one way to duck the restrictions on alcohol during the era of Prohibition in the United States (this particular bottle is not from the prohibition era — it dates from the 1950s or early 1960s)

It was first made fashionable in New York and other American cities before it was available in Europe.

Rexall drug stores sold bay rum (example pictured) during and after the Prohibition era in the United States, labeling it as "for external use only", but with 58% grain alcohol it was often used as a legal, if somewhat toxic, source of beverage alcohol. A 1933 recording by Clarence "Tom" Ashley and Gwen Foster, Bay Rum Blues, references drinking bay rum purchased from the Raylass chain department store in Gastonia, North Carolina.

== Products ==
While the original Bay Rum was sold as a medicinal tonic and other companies produced alcoholic beverages based on similar recipes, that business became less popular after the end of Prohibition. In the decades since World War II, several companies have entered the market with soaps, lotions, after-shaves, colognes and other products based on the fragrance. Most of these products are marketed to men and are produced by labs in several West Indian countries, as well as American and European fragrance firms. Production of the original bay rum from St. Thomas by A. H. Riise commenced in 1883; the company continues to produce a range of men's products locally in the US Virgin Islands under the St. Johns Bay Rum brand. Other producers include Caswell-Massey, Royall of Bermuda, and DS & Durga.

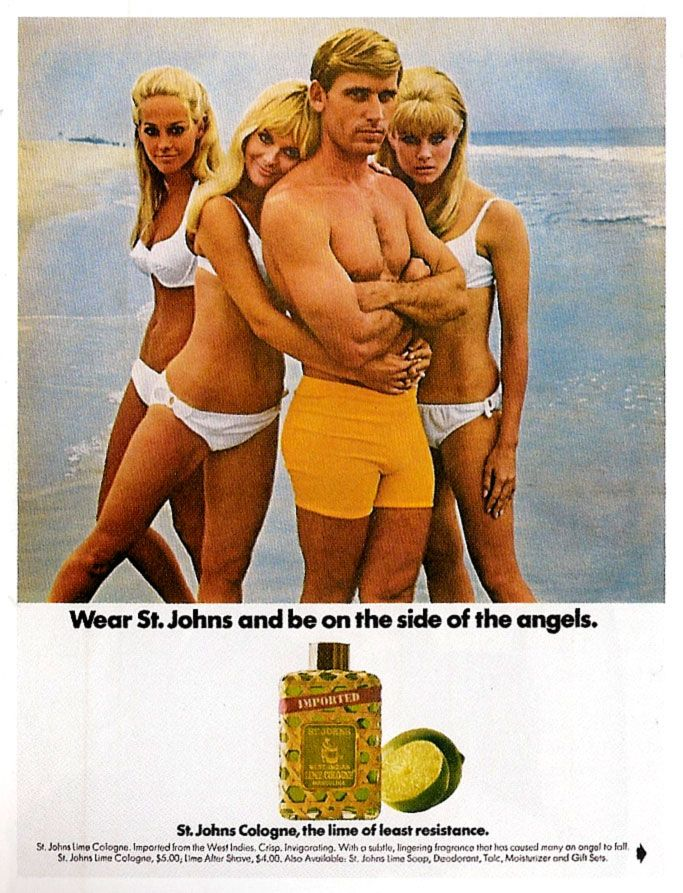
Ad from the 60's touting the all-male sex appeal of Bay Rum cologne

The bay laurel, the "bay leaves" in common culinary use, are from a completely unrelated species, Laurus nobilis, and not the West Indian bay tree. Bay laurel can be used to produce a similar, although not identical, product.
