= Shaving cream =

Cream applied to areas of hair growth to facilitate shaving

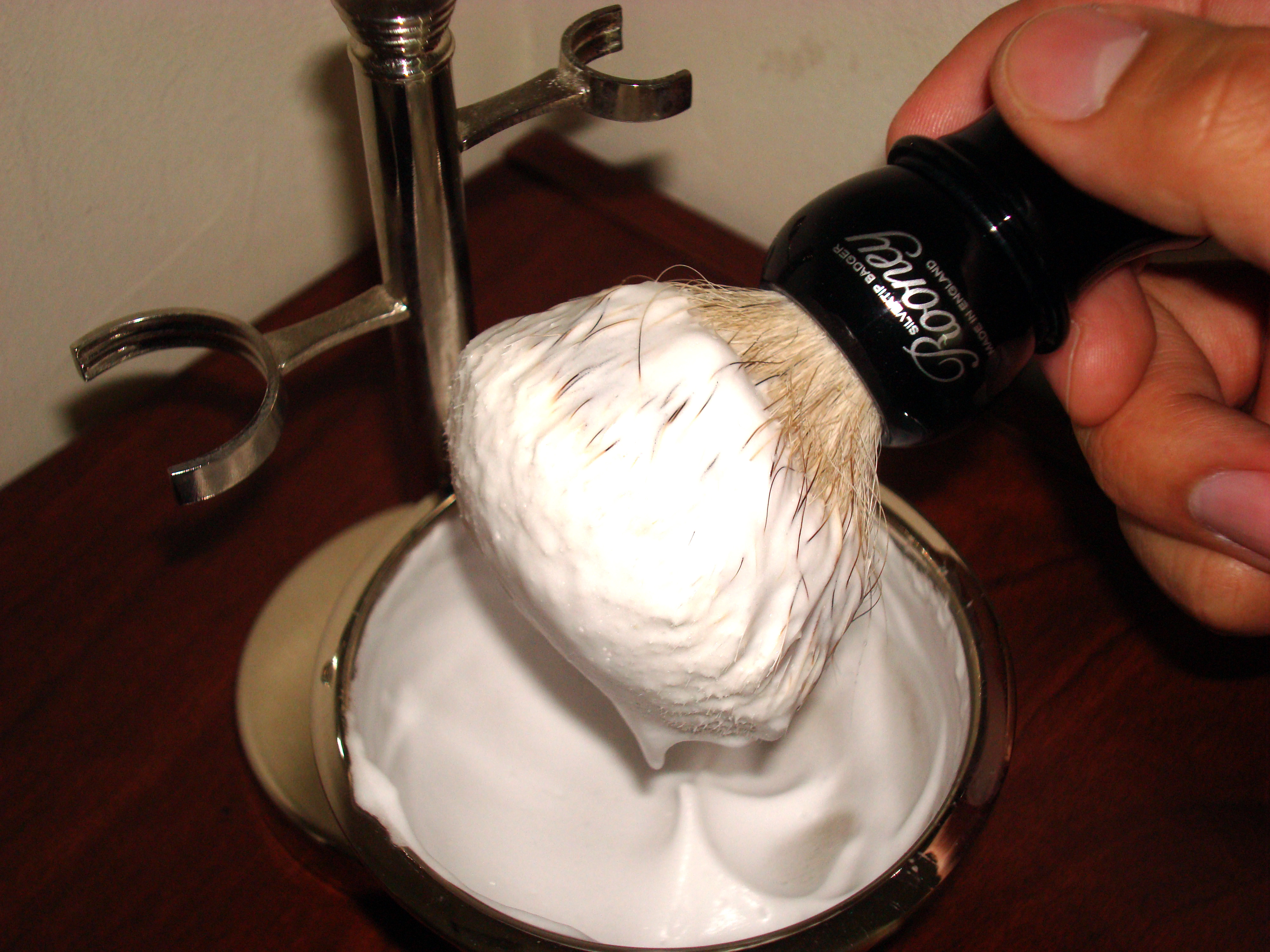
Shaving cream prepared with a shaving brush

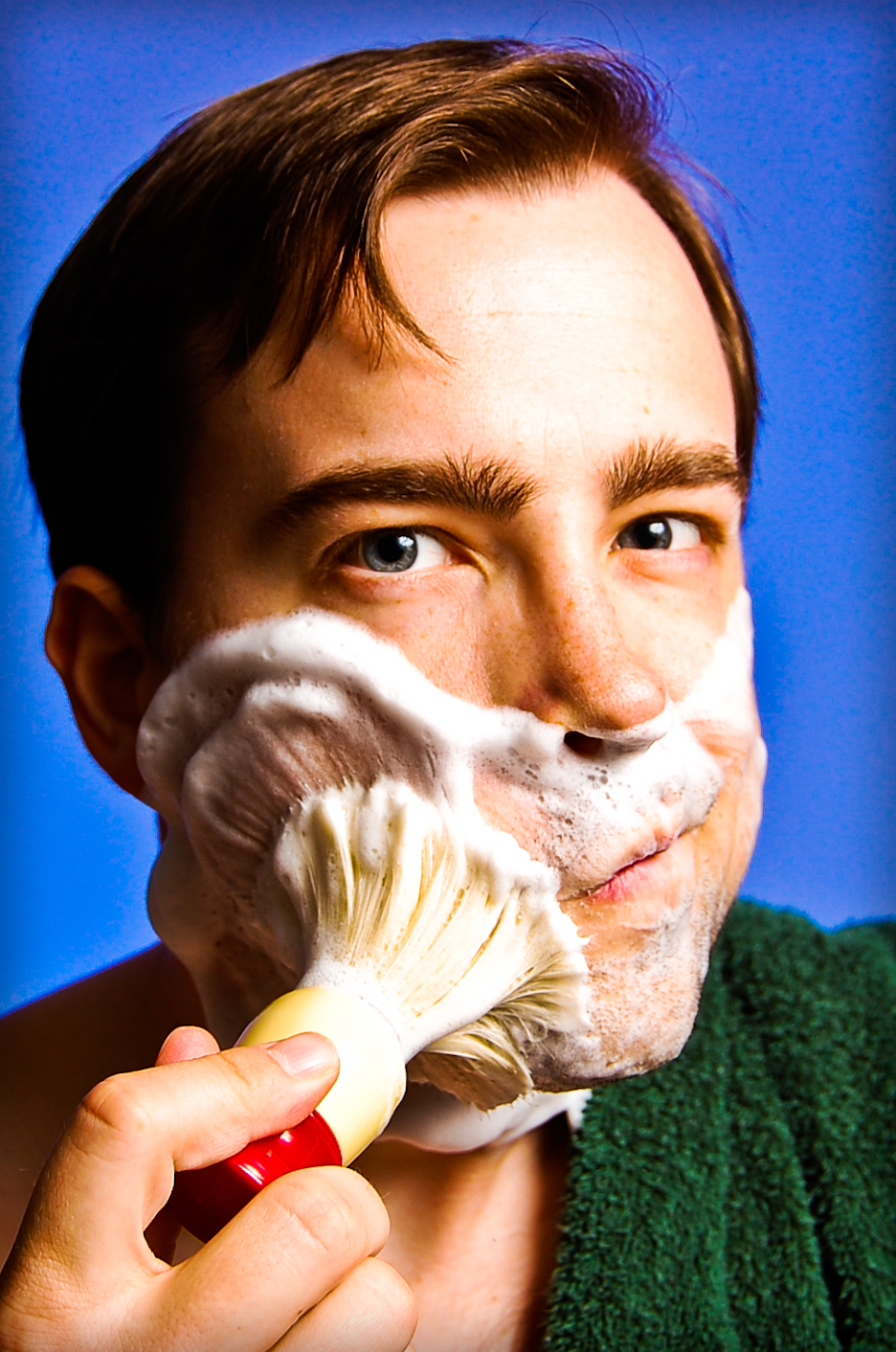
A man using shaving cream

Shaving cream or shave cream is a category of cream cosmetics used for shaving preparation. The purpose of shaving cream is to soften the hair by providing lubrication.

Different types of shaving creams include aerosol shaving cream (also known as shaving foam), latherless shaving cream (also called brushless shaving cream and non-aerosol shaving cream), and lather shaving cream or lathering shaving cream. The term shaving cream can also refer to the lather produced with a shaving brush from shaving soap or a lather shaving cream.

Shaving creams commonly consist of an emulsion of oils, soaps or surfactants, and water. In addition to soap, lather shaving creams include a humectant for softer consistency and keeping the lather moisturised. Brushless shaving creams, on the other hand, don't contain soap and so don't produce lather. They are an oil-in-water mixture to which humectants, wetting agents, and other ingredients are added. Aerosol shaving creams are essentially lather shaving cream in liquid form with propellants, vegetable waxes, and various oils added.

== History ==
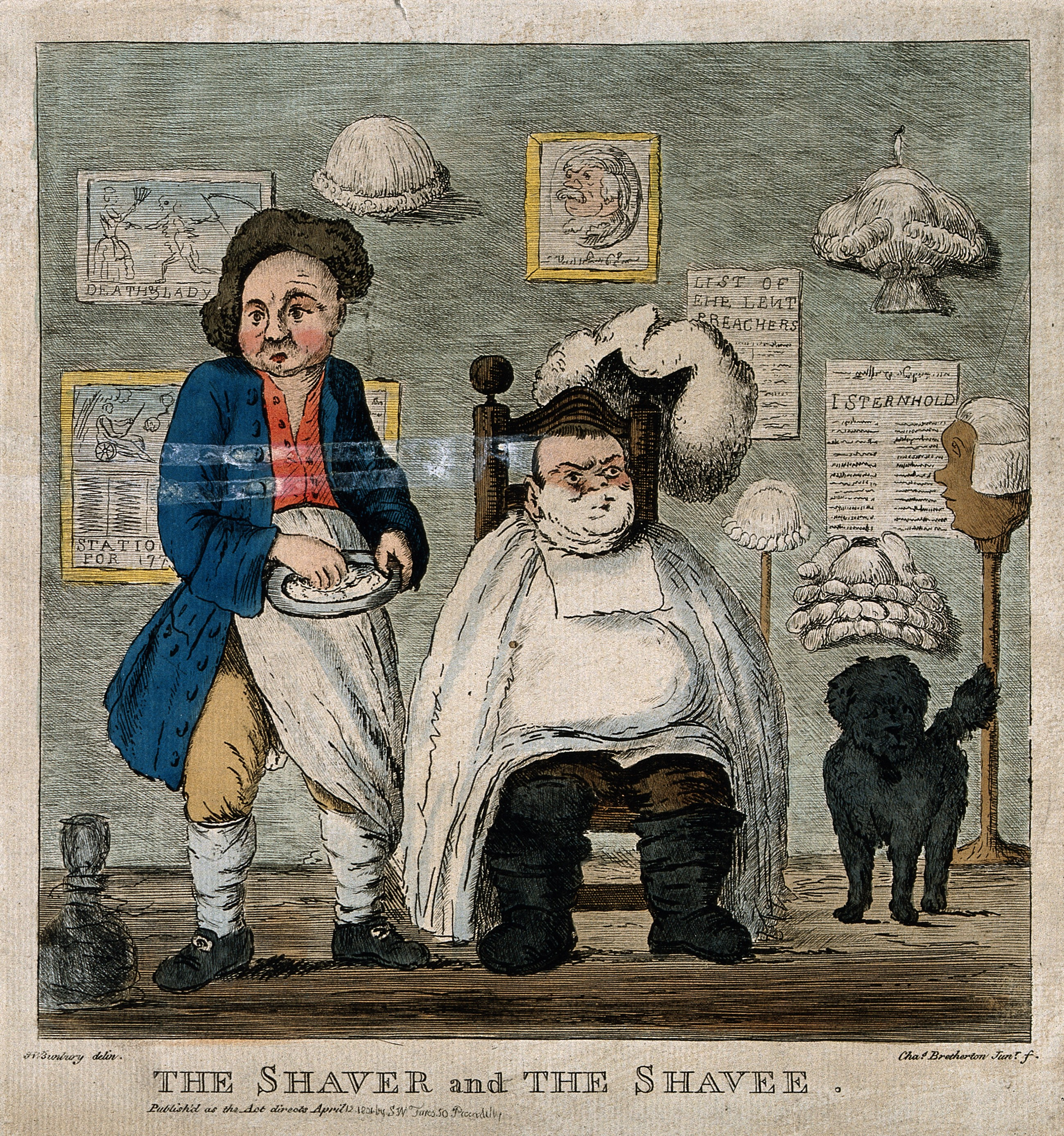
"A barber getting ready to shave the face of a seated customer", c. 1801

A rudimentary form of shaving cream was documented in Sumer around 3000 BC. This substance combined wood alkali and animal fat and was applied to a beard as a shaving preparation.

Until the early 20th century, bars or sticks of hard shaving soap were used. Later, tubes containing compounds of oils and soft soap were sold.

In 1919 Frank Shields, a former MIT professor developed the first shaving cream. The innovative product appeared on the American market under the name Barbasol and offered men an alternative to using a brush to work soap into lather. When it was first produced, Barbasol was filled and packaged entirely by hand in Indianapolis. The brand still exists and is currently available worldwide.

The first can of pressurized shaving cream was Rise shaving cream, introduced in 1949. By the following decade this format attained two-thirds of the American market. Chlorofluorocarbons (CFCs) were used as propellants until they were banned in the late 1990s for their effect on the ozone layer. Gaseous hydrocarbons such as mixtures of pentane, propane, butane and isobutane took their place.

In the 1970s, shaving gel was developed. In 1993, The Procter & Gamble Company patented a post-foaming gel composition, which turns the gel into a foam after application to the skin, combining properties of both foams and gels.

== Contents ==
Shaving creams and soaps are available as solids (bars); creams, generally in tubes; or aerosols. All forms may be applied with a shaving brush.

Shaving creams contain 20–30% soap [potassium or triethanolamine (TEA)], up to about 10% glycerine, emollients, emulsifiers, and foaming agents. Aerosols are diluted creams dispensed from pressurized cans with the aid of hydrocarbon propellants (up to about 10%). The flammability of the hydrocarbons is offset by the large amounts of water in cream formulations.

Beard-softening is due to hair hydration, which also depends on pH. In electric or dry shaving, swelling of the hairs is not desired, and such preparations use high amounts of alcohol (50–80%) to dry the skin and stiffen the hairs.

== See also ==
- Cold cream
- Depilatory cream
- Shaving soap
