= Thiers Issard =

French cutlery manufacturer

The Thiers Issard logo

Thiers Issard or Thiers Issard Sabatier (French pronunciation: [tjɛʁ isaʁ sabatje]) is a French cutlery manufacturer, one of a number of companies using the Sabatier name. It exports a wide range of knives and straight razors to approximately thirty countries. It is viewed as one of the top cutlery firms in Europe.

Along with DOVO Solingen, Thiers Issard is a manufacturer of straight razors in Europe and the rest of the world. It also makes exclusive and very expensive Damascus steel knives. It is located in Thiers, France, and is one of the better known of many cutlery manufacturers in that area. It has also been manufacturing razor blades since 1920. Thiers Issard is popular with US retailers.

== History ==
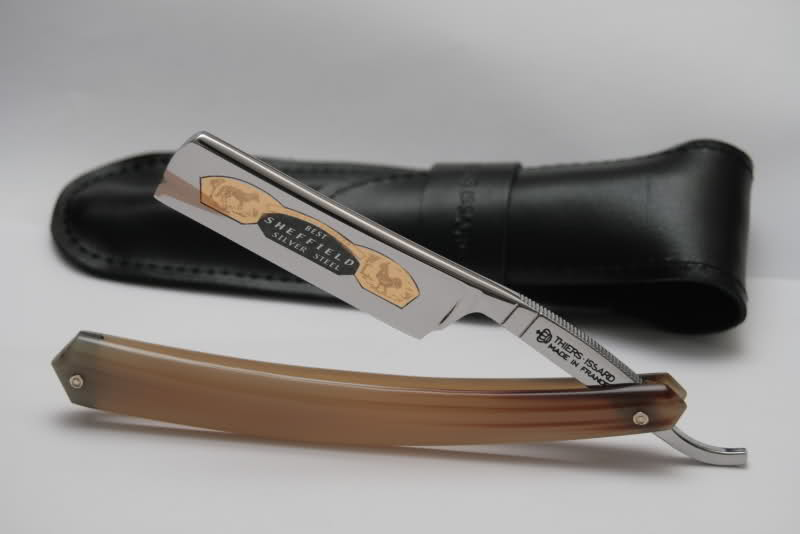
Fox and Rooster straight razor with a two pin handle

Thiers Issard was established in 1884 by Pierre Thiers (1860–1929). He was part of a family of master razor makers. The Thiers family owned their own forge. The "Chart of the Jurande" or the Professional Guild Charter of the time lists at least three "Thiers" as master razor makers.

In 1870 Pierre Thiers started as an apprentice to a master razor maker and, after 24 years in the trade, he had mastered the art well enough to become famous among the cognoscenti and connoisseurs of fine cutlery.

In 1884 Thiers established his own forge. He named his factory Thiers-Issard combining his last name and that of his wife as a way to differentiate himself from the rest of the family who owned similar businesses. From 1884 until his death in 1929, Thiers worked in his forge and died, reportedly, at work.

After his death, his son Pierre Thiers Jr. (1884–1962), assisted by his mother, continued the family business. Pierre Thiers Jr. worked as an apprentice under his father and was a skilled forger in his own right. As the business prospered, more family members joined the company starting with Louis Thiers (1910–1985) and later by another Pierre Thiers (1914–1997).

In 1985 the Thiers Issard company was acquired by Gilles Reynewaeter.

== Razor construction ==
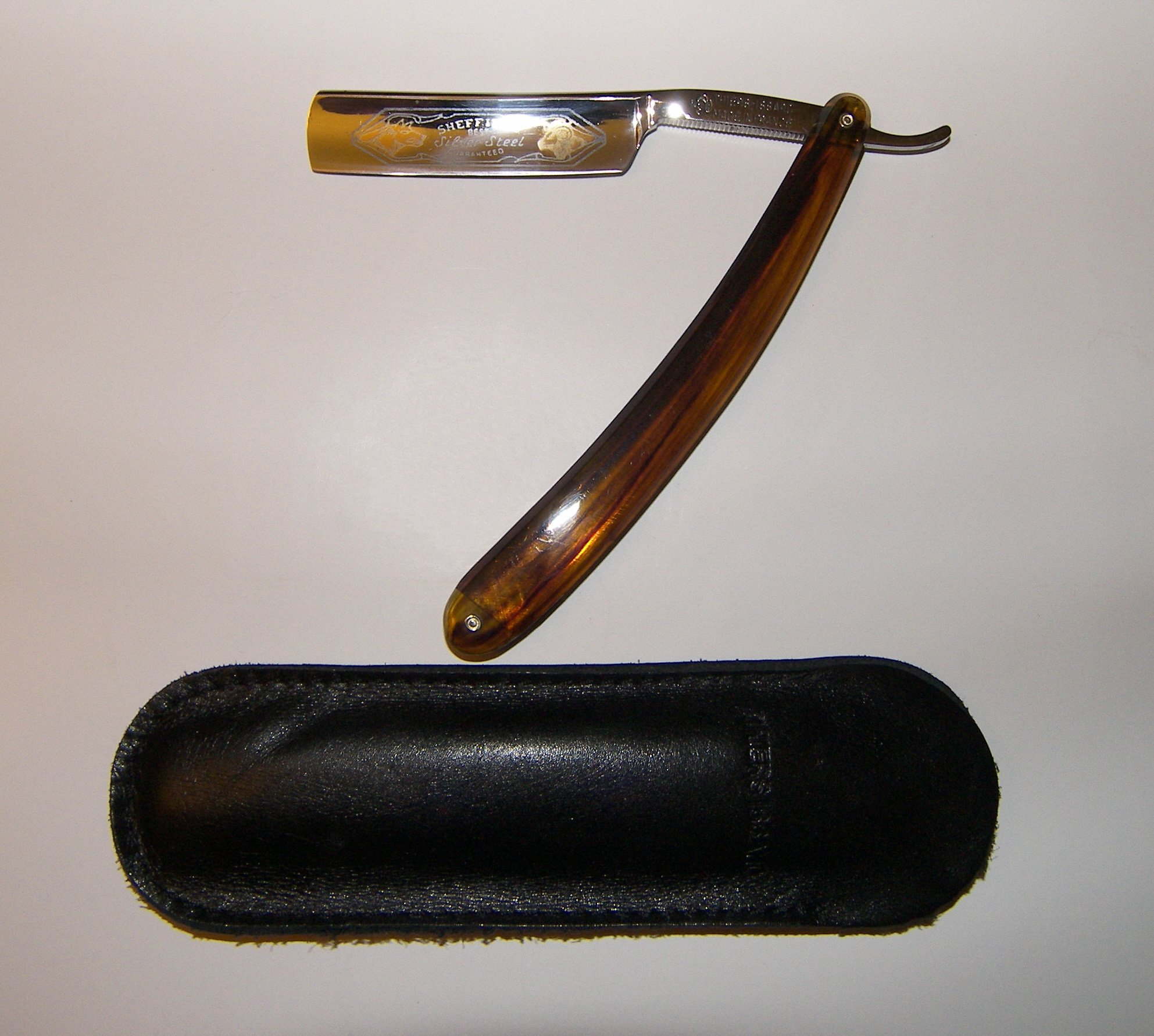
Loup et Bélier (wolf and ram) 6/8” extra hollow carbon steel singing blade. The gold inlaid heads of the wolf and the ram are on a mirror polished (poli glace) Sheffield silver steel blade. The double stabiliser implies full hollow ground blade. The lower side of the shank shows fluting for a more secure grip, while the upper side is smooth. The handle is faux tortoise. The razor comes in a leather pouch. Although the handle does not have a middle plug, the faux tortoise scales are wide apart like an arch and are resistant to deformation.

A straight razor blade (cut-throat razor) starts, at the Thiers Issard factory, as a shape called a blank supplied by the steel manufacturer. Thiers Issard traditionally has used Sheffield silver steel, long considered a superior quality carbon steel. The first step is to clean the blank using a heavy forge process called the detourage. Following the forging stage, a hole is drilled in the tang of the blade. This is a crucial step since after the steel hardening process it would be next to impossible to drill hardened steel without employing specialised methods such as electrical discharge machining, and even then the process would be too arduous to be practical. At this pre-hardening stage the decoration or guiochage of the blade is done, since the blade is malleable enough to be carved.

=== Lead hardening ===
The steel is hardened through a special process using a bath of molten lead where the forged steel blade is immersed at 800 °C. The efficient metal-to-metal heat transfer, from the surrounding lead to the steel blade, enables fast and uniform heating of the steel at the optimum temperature for maximum hardness. The steel is tempered following the hardening process, where at 300 °C it becomes flexible and brittleness is eliminated according to phase diagrams for steel.

Thiers Issard is allowed by a special exemption in French law to continue using this lead hardening process, while health concerns prohibit its use by any other manufacturer.

=== Grinding ===
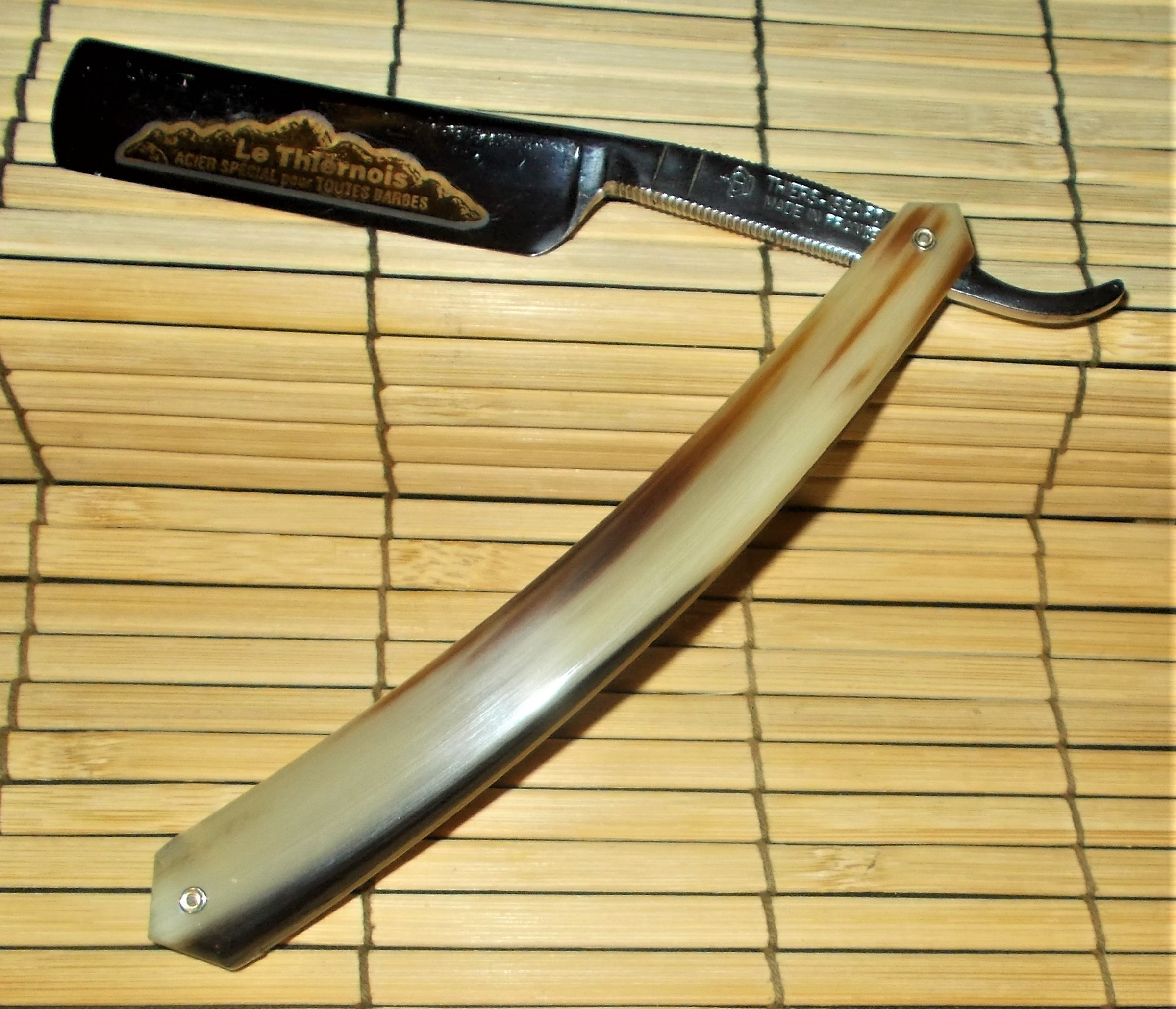
Thiers Issard Le Thiernois Sheffield silver steel, mirror-finished, singing, 5/8 inch blade, fully hollow ground, round-nose razor with decorated 24k gold-inlaid blade, dual-side fluted tang, double stabiliser, and double-pin, blonde horn scales

After hardening and tempering, the blanks are hollow ground, according to one of the two fundamental blade profiles. At the highest end of hollow ground, more hollow than even the 1/1 grade, is the so called singing razor, so named because its blade produces a specific resonant tone when plucked, similar to a guitar string. The singing razor blade at this excited stage is essentially a vibrating membrane. Its manufacturing process is so demanding that a full 25% of the blades get rejected as not meeting standards. Some of the company's cheaper lines are of half-hollow grind, such as the Super Gnome series of razors. Thiers Issard does not produce flat ground (wedge) type blades.

=== Finishing ===
Subsequently to grinding the blade is polished to various degrees of gloss. The best finish is poli glace or mirror finish. Mirror finish is the only finish used if gold leafing is to be part of the decoration of the blade.

Satin finish requires less polishing time and therefore is not as expensive to produce. This finish is mostly used with black acid etching. Satin finish can sometimes be applied, as a compromise, to the back of the blade while the mirror finish and gold leafing are applied to the more visible front of the blade. This way the blade will not be as expensive as a fully mirror finished one.

=== Spine decoration ===
Some of the more expensive Thiers Issard razors carry hand worked spine decoration to designs which date back to the 19th century.

=== Handles ===
The rivets are peened by hand to ensure stable movement of the razor blade while folding into the handle. The materials used include horn and exotic woods. The wood is impregnated with resins and pressed under high pressure to create a stable and water resistant material.

=== Blade decoration ===
The blade is decorated by engraving or gold leafing depending on the price. Less expensive blades undergo an electrolytic black acid engraving process. For more expensive blades, gold leafing applied by hand is employed, following a traditional process.

=== Sharpening ===
Sharpening is the final stage in the process. At first the blade is sharpened on a special grinding machine using a waterstone wheel. Following that the blade is hand honed on an antique Belgian flat waterstone. Finally the cutting edge is finished on a two-sided leather strop using a special paste on one side and natural oils from the human hand on the other.

=== Testing ===
Finally the blade mechanical properties are tested for flexibility and sharpness, as well as special tone tests for singing razors.

== Books ==
The Thiers Issard blades are also mentioned in books.

== See also ==
- Razor
- Safety razor
- Shaving
