= Sabatier =

Maker's mark used by several kitchen knife manufacturers

Sabatier is the maker's mark used by several kitchen knife manufacturers—by itself it is not a registered brand name. The name Sabatier is considered to imply a high-quality knife produced by one of a number of manufacturers in the Thiers region of central France using a full forging process; the knives of some of these manufacturers are highly regarded. However, the name "Sabatier" came into use before intellectual property laws and is not protected; knives legally bearing the name range from high-quality knives made in France to cheap mass-produced products of poor quality from France and other countries; a registered logo or full name, or both, such as "65 Sabatier Perrier", is necessary to establish origin and quality.

== History ==
The name originated in Thiers, France, at the beginning of the 19th century. The area of Thiers has been associated with the cutlery industry since the 15th century.

In the early 19th century, two separate families began using the name Sabatier to market their knives: Jean Sabatier of Le Moutier (lower Thiers) and Philippe Sabatier of Bellevue (upper Thiers).

== Brand names ==
The name was used by many different companies before intellectual property or trademark laws were fully established in France. In order to distinguish between the various makers of Sabatier knives, manufacturers are required to include a second word or symbol along with "Sabatier". Over the years many marks have been registered. In 1979, after the sale of the Moutier Sabatier brands to Cuisinox, the various holders of the brands formed an association to protect the brand name.

- SABATIER frères
- K SABATIER
- SABATIER PERRIER
- 65 SABATIER
- 62 SABATIER
- France SABATIER Jeune K Garanti
- SABATIER Jeune Garanti with a bunch of grapes
- SABATIER Acier Fondu Garanti with a bunch of grapes
- France SABATIER Acier Fondu couronne K Garanti
- Véritable SABATIER France
- Professional SABATIER
- SABATIER Professional
- V SABATIER France
- V SABATIER Acier Fondu Garanti
- V SABATIER Extra Fin
- SABATIER 689 Couronné
- SABATIER Couronné
- SABATIER 589 Couronné
- SABATIER Trompette
- SABATIER Deg
- SABATIER****
- SabatieR
- SABATIER Trumpet France
- Sarry SABATIER
- Le vrai SABATIER
- Le seul SABATIER
- L’unique SABATIER 1ère qualité
- SABATIER with a stylised slicing disk
- SABATIER Lion
- SABATIER Diamant
- SABATIER Elephant

While there are many knife manufacturers using Sabatier as their brand, some Sabatier manufacturers are considered authentic, and some are not. Generally speaking, among connoisseurs of fine cutlery, only knives manufactured in Thiers from well-established manufacturers from the 19th century are considered "genuine" Sabatier knives.

Many other manufacturers, both in France and elsewhere, use the Sabatier name on their knives; however, they are usually mass-produced, and of poor quality. Neither words such as vrai or garanti, nor "Made in France", ensure a good knife.

== Companies selling Sabatier knives ==
- ETS Sabatier Aîné & Perrier - Sabatier Aîné & Perrier claims to be the oldest Sabatier knife maker still in existence and operated by the descendants of Phillipe Sabatier of Bellevue, Thiers, France. The brand has been based in Thiers, the French cutlery trade capital, since the early 19th century. They have operated for more than 220 years and have sold under the brand name Sabatier-k since 1834, to distinguish themselves from the Sabatier of Le Moutier. The first references to the mark "K" can be found in the town archives, engraved on the Silver Tablet of Cutlers, dated 7 June 1813 under number 231. Eight generations of the Sabatier family of Bellevue have been involved in the business.
- Thiers Issard Sabatier - Thiers Issard Sabatier have manufactured the Sabatier Elephant knives in Thiers since 1958.
- Therias et L'Econome - Therias et L'Econome claim to have been manufacturing knives in Thiers since 1819. They sell Sabatier knives under the brand L'Unique Sabatier as well as Mexeur & Cie. In 2015 it was sold to Guy Degrenne S.A. Degrenne still sells Sabatier branded knives under their Ideal Forge label.
- Rousselon Frères - Owners of the Mexeur Lion Sabatier make of knives since 1991, manufactured in Thiers. They claim the make was officially registered in 1812.
- Sabatier Diamant - Manufacture the Sabatier Diamant brand in Thiers.
- Amefa Couzon Cuisinox and Richardson Sheffield - In December 2005 Dutch company Amefa bought France's second-largest cutlery company Couzon, the owner of Cuisinox. In 2007 Amefa purchased the British knife maker Richardson Sheffield. They own the Sabatier Trompette (trumpet) and V Sabatier ranges.
