= Silver steel =

Type of tool steel

Silver steel is common tool steel that is supplied as a centerless ground round bar (with tolerances similar to that of drill bit). The name comes from the highly polished appearance of the rods; there is no silver in the alloy.

== Characteristics ==
In the annealed state it has a hardness of 27 HRC. It can be hardened to 64 HRC.

== Composition ==
The composition is defined by the British Standard BS-1407.

The European/Werkstoff equivalent is 1.2210 / 115CrV3, which also includes some vanadium.

Composition of silver steel
Element	BS-1407 silver steel			DIN 1.2210 / 115CrV3	
Element	Min	Typ	Max	Min	Max
Carbon	0.95%	1.13%	1.25%	1.10%	1.25%
Chromium	0.35%	0.43%	0.45%	0.50%	0.80%
Manganese	0.25%	0.37%	0.45%	0.20%	0.40%
Silicon	0	0.22%	0.40%	0.15%	0.30%
Vanadium				0.07%	0.12%
Phosphorus	0	0.014%	0.045%	0	0.03%
Sulphur	0	0.018%	0.045%	0	0.03%
Iron	Balance			Balance	

== Applications ==
Amongst other applications, it has been widely used to make such things as punches, engravers, and screwdrivers. Sheffield silver steel is used in France as a blade steel for straight razors. In Finland, German silver steel was and still is widely used for Puukko knives.
